= List of utilitarians =

This is an incomplete list of advocates of utilitarianism and/or consequentialism.

== Deceased ==
=== Ancient & Medieval ===
- Epicurus
- Lucretius
- Mozi
- Roger Bacon

=== 17th century ===
- Richard Cumberland
- John Gay
- Bernard Mandeville

=== 18th century ===
- John Brown
- Cesare Beccaria
- Jeremy Bentham
- Thomas Cooper
- Soame Jenyns
- William Johnson Fox
- Anthony Hammond
- Claude Adrien Helvétius
- Baron d'Holbach
- Francis Hutcheson
- Edmund Law
- James Mill
- John Neal
- William Paley
- Joseph Priestley
- Jean Baptiste Say
- Thomas Rutherforth
- Thomas Southwood Smith
- Thomas Perronet Thompson
- William Thompson
- Abraham Tucker

=== 19th century ===
- John Austin
- Samuel Bailey
- Alexander Bain
- George Bentham
- Peregrine Bingham the Younger
- Bernard Bolzano
- Edwin Chadwick
- John Collier
- Charles Darwin
- Francis Ysidro Edgeworth
- Henry Fawcett
- Thomas Fowler
- William Godwin
- George Grote
- Richard Hildreth
- William Stanley Jevons
- Edward Livingston
- James MacKaye
- Alfred Marshall
- Harriet Taylor Mill
- John Stuart Mill
- G. E. Moore
- J. Howard Moore
- John L. O'Sullivan
- Hastings Rashdall
- David Ricardo
- David George Ritchie
- Lionel Robbins
- Henry Sidgwick
- James Fitzjames Stephen
- Leslie Stephen
- William Thompson

=== 20th century ===
- Richard Brandt
- Esperanza Guisán
- R. M. Hare
- H. L. A. Hart
- Roy Harrod
- John Harsanyi
- Henry Hazlitt
- Arthur Cecil Pigou
- Karl Popper
- James Rachels
- Bertrand Russell
- Ching-Lai Sheng
- J. J. C. Smart
- Timothy Sprigge

== Living ==
- Jacob M. Appel
- Joseph Bankman
- Sam Bankman-Fried
- Jonathan Baron
- Yves Bonnardel
- Richard Yetter Chappell
- Tyler Cowen
- Julia Driver
- Jonathan Glover
- Dan Goldstick
- Robert E. Goodin
- Joshua Greene
- Brad Hooker
- Shelly Kagan
- Eric Kaufmann
- Lawrence Krauss
- Zell Kravinsky
- Helga Kuhse
- Richard Layard
- Katarzyna de Lazari-Radek
- Ludvig Lindström
- William MacAskill
- Dylan Matthews
- Yew-Kwang Ng
- Alastair Norcross
- David Olivier
- Michel Onfray
- Toby Ord
- David Pearce
- Steven Pinker
- Stuart Rachels
- Jacy Reese Anthis
- Bart Schultz
- Peter Singer
- Scott Sumner
- L. W. Sumner
- Torbjörn Tännsjö
- Robert Wright
