= Holly Martin Smith =

American philosophy professor

Education
- Education: University of Michigan

Philosophical work
- Institutions: Rutgers University, University of Arizona, University of North Carolina at Chapel Hill, University of Illinois at Chicago Circle, University of Michigan at Ann Arbor, University of Michigan at Flint, University of Pittsburgh
- Main interests: Biomedical ethics, consequentialism, moral responsibility, normative ethics
- Website: fas-philosophy.rutgers.edu/hsmith/index.html

Holly Martin Smith (also known as Holly S. Goldman) is Distinguished Professor of Philosophy at Rutgers, the State University of New Jersey. Her publications focus on questions in normative ethics, moral responsibility and structural questions common to normative theories.

A recipient of the Carl and Lily Pforzheimer Foundation Fellowship at the National Humanities Center (2013–14), she held an American Association of University Women Postgraduate Fellowship (1975–76) and a National Endowment for the Humanities Fellowship for Independent Study (1982–83.)

Between 1985 and 2006 she held a series of increasingly responsible academic administrative positions, first at the University of Arizona, including Head, Department of Philosophy (1985–90), Vice Provost for Academic Affairs (1991–June 1993), and Dean of the College of Social and Behavioral Sciences (1993–July 2001); and then at Rutgers University-New Brunswick from 2001 to 2006: Executive Dean Faculty of Arts and Sciences and Dean of the Graduate School-New Brunswick. Active in national academic administrative organizations, she served as President of the Council of Colleges of Arts and Sciences, a national organization of arts and sciences deans, during 2000–01.

== Life and career ==
Smith received her early education in Colorado Springs, Colorado. Attending Wellesley College on a National Merit Scholarship, she received her B.A. as First Trustee Fellow in 1966, followed by an M.A. (1970) and a Ph.D. (1972) in Philosophy from the University of Michigan. Smith taught at Tufts University (1970–71), The University of Michigan at Flint (1971–72), The University of Pittsburgh (1972–73), The University of Michigan at Ann Arbor (1973–80), The University of Illinois at Chicago Circle (1980–83), The University of North Carolina at Chapel Hill (Visiting Associate Professor, 1981–82), and The University of Arizona (1983–2001). From 2001, she has served as Distinguished Professor of Philosophy at Rutgers University-New Brunswick.

Her husband Alvin I. Goldman was Board of Governors Professor of Philosophy and Cognitive Science at Rutgers. Her sister Sherri Smith, a prominent fiber artist, is Catherine B. Heller Collegiate Professor at the University of Michigan.

== Research ==
Smith's philosophical work falls into four main areas: biomedical ethics (with an emphasis on reproductive ethics); consequentialism (the theory that the moral status of our acts depend on the value of the acts consequences); moral responsibility; and normative ethics concerns that transcend particular normative theories.

=== Reproductive ethics ===
Smith defended a liberal perspective, arguing that the fetus has no natural right to the use of its mother's body during pregnancy, and that it has no right to "rescue" by the mother.

=== Consequentialism ===
Smith has focused on forms of rule utilitarianism, arguing, contra David Lyons, that act utilitarianism and full compliance forms of rule utilitarianism do not always prescribe the same actions, and maintaining that the project of finding an appropriate definition for "consequences" within rule utilitarianism had been misconceived and was doomed to failure.

=== Moral responsibility ===
Smith explored how to assess an agent's degree of credit or blameworthiness for an action when the agent acts from a mixture of good and bad motives. She worked on the question of whether an agent is blameworthy for a wrongful act done in culpable ignorance. Her most noted paper is "Culpable Ignorance", which was named by The Philosopher's Annual as one of the ten best articles in 1983. It analysed in detail the terms of the debate between those who argue that a person is blameworthy for an action performed in culpable ignorance, versus those who hold that while a person is blameworthy for the initial dereliction of failing to acquire information, that does not taint a subsequent action, done in culpable ignorance, that is itself done from acceptable motives.

Smith concluded that the only defense for the position—a controversial one in law and philosophy—is one that holds people blameworthy for the unlucky consequences of their actions.

Later she explored the implications of cognitive and social psychology for questions about moral responsibility, arguing that agents should not be held responsible for emotional reactions and behavior that issue from cognitive processes involving automatic (Kahneman/Tversky's System 1) responses to environmental stimuli.

==== Actualism ====
Much of Smith's work focused on questions about right and wrong that are common to many distinct ethical theories, including both consequentialist theories and deontological ones (the moral status of an act depends on features of an act other than its consequences, such as whether or not it involves telling a lie or breaking a promise). Her paper "Dated Rightness and Moral Imperfection" helped launch a debate now known as the debate between Actualism and Possibilism by arguing for the first time in favor of Actualism. Possibilists believe that whether or not the agent ought to perform an immediate action depends on whether performing it would enable the ideal course of action in the future. Actualists believe that whether or not an agent ought to perform the action depends on what performing that action would actually lead her to do in the future.

The issue is illustrated by an example from Smith/Goldman's later paper "Doing the Best One Can". A graduate student asks faculty member S for comments on a paper he plans to present at a job interview. If S agrees and comments on the paper, the student will improve the paper substantially, have a highly successful interview, and receive an offer for a three-year job. If S accepts the task but fails to comment on the paper in time, the student will make no revisions, have a dismal interview, and receive no job offer. If S declines to provide comments, the student will elicit comments from a less expert faculty member, make less helpful revisions on the paper, have a moderately successful interview, and receive a one-year job offer. Clearly S's accepting the task would enable her to follow the ideal course of action, namely reading and commenting on the paper in a timely way, resulting in the student's receiving a three-year job. However, in reality if S accepted the task, she would actually fail to comment on the paper in time, either because she would misunderstand the deadline, or because of her time-consuming administrative chores. In this case, the student would receive no job offer. Possibilism recommends that S agree to comment, that would support her intent to follow the best course of action. Actualism takes a more realistic stance: it recommends that S decline since that would lead to a better outcome. Smith argues this case requires the same reasoning as a prudential decision, such as deciding to drive carefully to avoid a crash.

=== Information ===
Smith also considered the question of how to use moral theories in actual decision-making, especially given agent's lack of enough information about the world to ascertain accurately which action their favored moral theory implies. Thus the intent to avoid adultery may be thwarted by not knowing that a partner is actually married. And someone trying to follow W. D. Ross's prima facie duty to keep promises may fail should she forget the promise. Smith repeatedly explored these "epistemic" problems and argued that the solution depends on recognizing that moral theories must be supplemented by a hierarchy of decision rules that prescribe acts as "subjectively right" to agents who are uncertain what the moral theory itself recommends. Smith was awarded a National Humanities Center Fellowship during 2013–14 to complete a book manuscript on this cluster of epistemic challenges to using morality to make decisions.

== Recognition ==
Smith's article "Culpable Ignorance" was selected by The Philosopher's Annual as one of the ten best articles to appear in print in 1983. Fellowships supporting her research included:

- Danforth Graduate Fellowship (1966–71),
- American Association of University Women Postgraduate Fellowship (1975–76);
- National Endowment for the Humanities Fellowship for Independent Study (1982–83),
- Council for Philosophical Studies Institute on Moral Problems in Medicine Fellowship;
- Visiting Fellowship from the School of Philosophy, Research School of the Social Sciences, The Australian National University (Summer 2011);
- Carl and Lily Pforzheimer Foundation Fellowship, National Humanities Center (2013–14).

While dean she was elected to the Presidency of the Council of Colleges of Arts and Sciences (2000–01). She served as chair of the American Philosophical Association Pacific Division Program Committee, 1989–90, and is a member of the Stanford Encyclopedia of Philosophy Editorial Board as subject co-editor for Normative Ethics (from August 2013).

== Selected publications ==
- "Dated Rightness and Moral Imperfection", The Philosophical Review, Vol. LXXXV (October 1976), 449–487 (published under the name Holly S. Goldman).
- "Doing the Best One Can", in Values and Morals, eds Alvin Goldman and Jaegwon Kim (Reidel, 1978), 186–214 (as Holly S. Goldman).
- "Culpable Ignorance", The Philosophical Review, Vol. XCII (October, 1983), 543–571.
- "Making Moral Decisions", Nous, Vol. XXII, No. 1 (March 1988), 89–108.
- "Varieties of Moral Worth and Moral Credit", Ethics, Vol. 101 (January 1991), 279–303.
- "A Paradox of Promising", The Philosophical Review, Vol. 106, No. 2 (April 1997), 153–196.
- "Subjective Rightness", in Social Philosophy and Policy 27 (Summer 2010), 64–110.
- "Non-Tracing Cases of Culpable Ignorance", Criminal Law and Philosophy, Vol. 5, Issue 2 (2011), 115–146.
- "The Moral Clout of Reasonable Beliefs", in Mark Timmons (ed.), Oxford Studies in Normative Ethics, Vol. I (Oxford: Oxford University Press, 2011), 1–25.
- "The Subjective Moral Duty to Inform Oneself before Acting", forthcoming in Ethics.
