= Non-consequential reasoning =

Non-consequential reasoning refers to a phenomenon in which one’s judgment or evaluation is not based on the actual or expected outcomes (consequences) of an event, but rather on other factors. This type of reasoning stands in contrast to consequentialism and can sometimes lead people’s final decisions to deviate from what would be considered normatively rational and reasonable, such as Savage's sure-thing principle.

== When does non-consequential reasoning occur? ==
Such phenomenon has often been observed in decision-making under uncertainty, where people’s judgement of an event could be contingent on multiple possible states of the world. Normatively, when multiple possible states of the world are involved, people should consider the consequences of each and integrate them to form a coherent overall judgment and make a decision.

However, research has shown that individuals often fail to reason in a consequentialist manner when making decisions. They frequently display inconsistencies between their evaluations of specific individual cases and their judgments of the overall event. Such inconsistencies often carry over into people’s choices and decision-making.

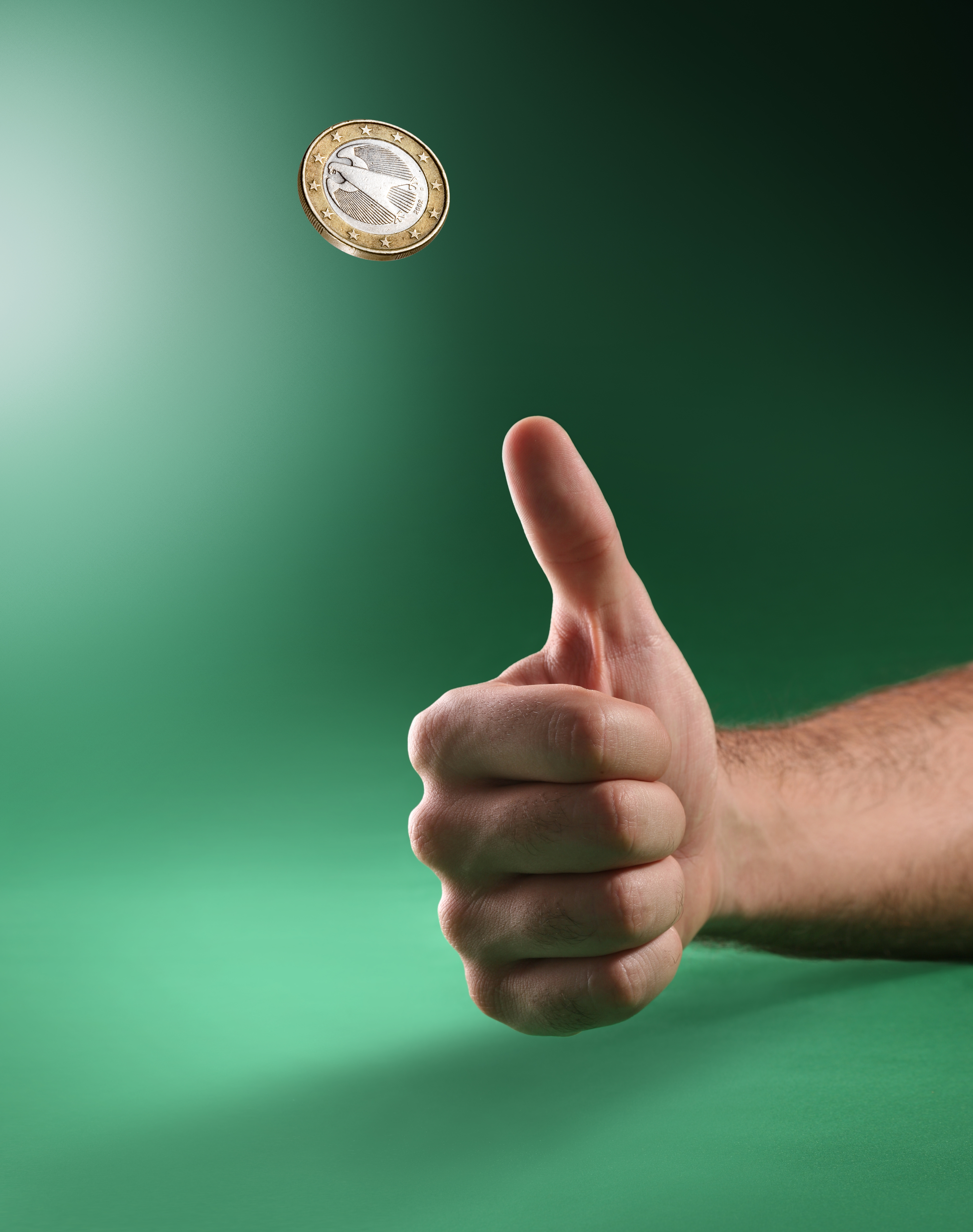
An example of nonconsequential reasoning illustrated through a coin-toss gambling game.

For example, imagine that you are playing a coin-toss game. The setup is simple: the coin gives you an equal chance of winning $200 or losing $100. Now suppose you have just played the game, but you do not know the outcome yet. That means you have either won $200 or lost $100. Would you want to play the game again?

Normatively, following a consequentialist reasoning principle, when deciding whether to play again, people should incorporate both possible cases into their consideration:

(a) Would I want to play again if I had just won $200?

b) Would I want to play again if I had just lost $100?

However, Tversky and Shafir (1992) found that people express strong interest in playing again when they know they won $200, and they also express strong interest in playing again when they know they lost $100. Yet when they do not know whether they won or lost, their interest in playing again becomes less. In other words, people are willing to play the second game when they know they won the first game, and they are also willing to play when they know they lost. However, when they do not know whether they won or lost the first game, they become unwilling to play the second game.

== Different relevant terminologies across disciplines ==
=== Psychology and behavioral science ===
Non-consequential reasoning in psychology and behavioral science is sometimes referred to as the disjunction effect. Below is the definition of the disjunction effect as described by Tversky and Shafir in their paper Thinking Through Uncertainty: Nonconsequential Reasoning and Choice (1992):

“A disjunction effect occurs when people prefer x over y when they know that event A obtains, and they also prefer x over y when they know that event A does not obtain, but they prefer y over x when it is unknown whether or not A obtains.”

Research has demonstrated that people’s choices are often made without thinking through disjunctions, thereby violating Savage’s sure-thing principle.

In addition to the coin-toss example mentioned earlier, Tversky and Shafir (1992) found that, in one of their studies, many students chose to travel to Hawaii both when they had passed their exam and when they had failed it. According to Savage’s sure-thing principle, they should also choose to travel to Hawaii when the outcome of the exam is unknown. However, the researchers found that when people did not yet know their exam results, they chose not to travel to Hawaii. Tversky and Shafir suggested that uncertainty about which outcome would occur may influence people’s preferences. The presence of uncertainty makes it difficult for people to focus on each individual branch of the decision (e.g., the branch in which they fail the exam vs. the branch in which they pass). As a result, people become less likely to form a clear preference that is properly contingent on each possible outcome.

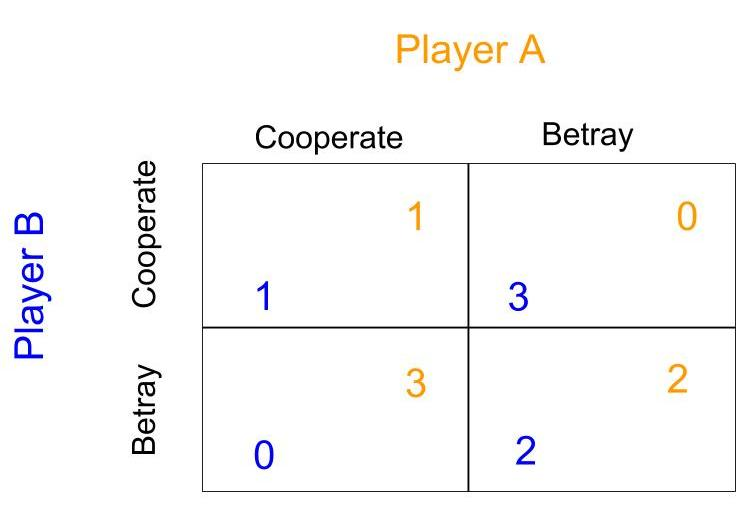
A typical Prisoner's Dilemma.

Another example is the Prisoner's Dilemma, where two players simultaneously choose either to cooperate for mutual benefit or to defect for personal gain. Researchers found that people tended to defect both when they knew the other player had defected and when they knew the other player had cooperated. Paradoxically, however, participants were more likely to cooperate when the other player’s choice was unknown. In other words, even when people made the same decision under each known state of the world, they often switched to a different decision when the state was unknown.

These examples suggest that when making choices, people’s reasoning often do not follow the principle of consequential reasoning. Their final decision, when any of the possible states of the world could be true, may flip even if they prefer the same choice under each individual state of world.

=== Behavioral economics ===
Here is a simple probability decision tree diagram that simulates how people should think through all possible states of the world using consequential reasoning.

Related to the non-consequential reasoning concept, contingent reasoning in the economics literature describes a cognitive process in which people think through how an event would unfold depending on which state of the world turns out to be true. Contingent reasoning involves considering alternative possible scenarios (or contingencies) and inferring what would follow under each possibility. This “if–then” reasoning process aligns with the concept of conditional probability—that is, conditional on certain event being true, people then reason about the outcome of such case (in other words, what would happen following this certain event).

However, people do not always engage in contingent reasoning fully or accurately. One reason why accurate contingent reasoning is difficult is the presence of uncertainty during the reasoning process. When multiple possible states of the world need to be considered, the number of factors to account for increases. This makes the overall reasoning process more challenging.

== Consequences ==
Engaging in non-consequential reasoning can, in turn, lead to biases and mistakes in decision-making. When people fail to account for the consequences of possible states of the world, they may rely on incomplete or misleading information, resulting in judgments that are inconsistent or suboptimal.

=== Choice inconsistency ===
As the examples indicated earlier, when making choices, people often follow a non-consequential reasoning process, which can result in inconsistent decisions. Even when people prefer the same option under each possible state of the world, they sometimes make a different choice when it is could be any of those states being true. Such inconsistency is not normatively reasonable and violates Savage’s sure-thing principle, as rational decision-making should integrate the consequences of all possible states and yield the same overall decision if the preferred option remains consistent across them.

=== Suboptimal decision ===
Non-consequential reasoning can also lead to suboptimal decisions, as people fail to consider the implications of all relevant possible states of the world. By neglecting to integrate outcomes across these states, people often forgo profit-maximizing options and instead make choices that are less optimal.

=== The pursuit of noninstrumental information ===
Bastardi and Shafir (1998; 2000) found that people do not always evaluate missing information in a fully consequentialist way. They argued that people sometimes pursue noninstrumental information, meaning information that should not affect the decision even though it appears relevant.

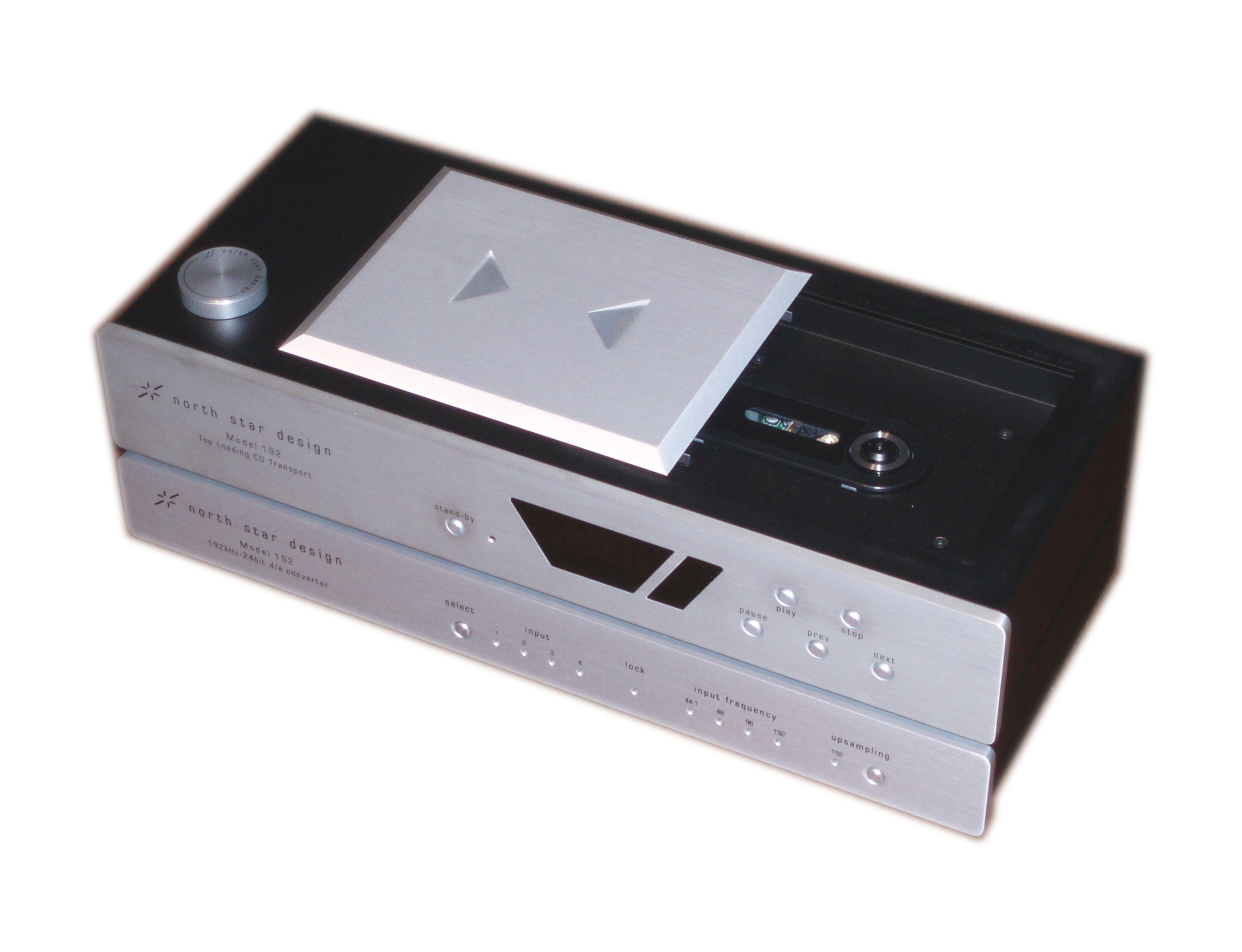
A CD player example used in Bastardi and Shafir (1998; 2000) shows that people often fail to view missing information in a consequentialist way when making decisions.

For example, imagine that you want to buy a CD player whether or not you have to pay for amplifier repairs. In that situation, the amplifier warranty is noninstrumental because it should not influence your decision to buy the CD player. However, Bastardi and Shafir showed that people often still seek this type of unnecessary information.

In their experiment, some participants were told that the amplifier warranty had already expired, so they would definitely need to pay $90 for repairs. In this condition, about 91% of participants chose to buy the CD player. In a separate control condition, when participants knew the warranty would cover the repair, even more participants chose to buy it. This shows that people generally want the CD player regardless of whether the repair is free or costs $90. Therefore, the information about the amplifier warranty is noninstrumental.

However, participants behaved very differently when the warranty status was unknown. Only 26% of participants chose to buy the CD player right away when they do not know the information about the amplifier warranty. Nearly 70% chose to wait for the warranty information, even though this information should not have affected their decision at all.

== See also ==
- Conditional probability
- Contingency
- Consequentialism
- Disjunction
- Decision under uncertainty
- Game theory
- Savage's sure-thing principle
