= Two-level utilitarianism =

Theory of ethics

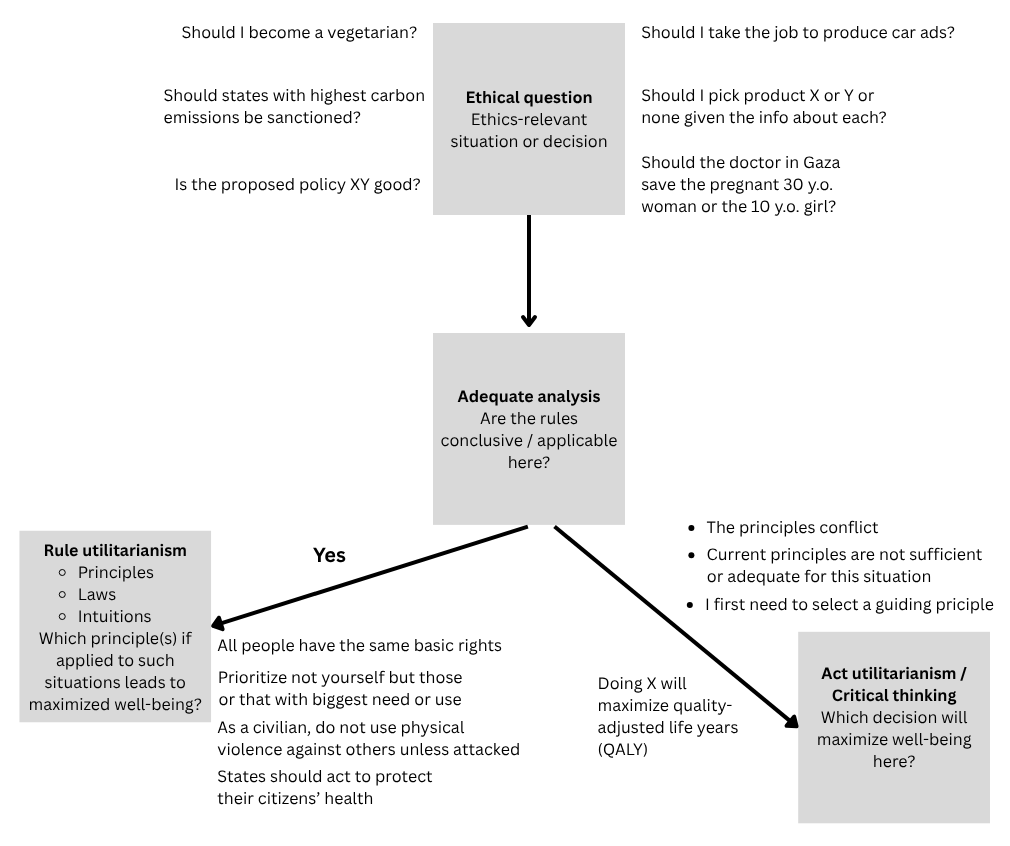

Two-level utilitarianism is a utilitarian theory of ethics according to which a person's moral decisions should be based on a set of moral rules, except in certain rare situations where it is more appropriate to engage in a "critical" level of moral reasoning. The theory was initially developed by R. M. Hare.

Consequentialists believe that an action is right if it produces the best possible state of affairs. In particular, act utilitarianism states that the morally right action is the one which produces the most well-being, whereas rule utilitarianism states that the morally right action is the one that is in accordance with a moral rule whose general observance would create the most well-being.

Two-level utilitarianism combines act utilitarianism and rule utilitarianism. In terms of two-level utilitarianism, act utilitarianism can be likened to the "critical" level of moral thinking, while rule utilitarianism can be likened to the "intuitive" level.

== In the context of utilitarianism ==
Utilitarianism is a type of consequentialist ethical theory. According to such theories, only the outcome of an action is morally relevant (this contrasts with deontology, according to which moral actions flow from duties or motives). There are similarities with preference utilitarianism, where utility is defined as individual preference rather than positive conscious experience.

The two predecessor theories to two-level utilitarianism, act and rule utilitarianism, were beset by various objections. For example, rule utilitarianism was criticized for implying that in some cases an individual should pursue a course of action that would obviously not maximize utility. Conversely, act utilitarianism was criticized for not allowing for a "human element" in its consequence estimates, i.e. it is sometimes too difficult for an ordinary person.

As a descriptive model of the two levels, Hare posited two extreme cases of people, one of whom would only use critical moral thinking and the other of whom would only use intuitive moral thinking. The former he called the "archangel" and the latter the "prole". It was not Hare's intention to divide up the entire human race into either archangels or proles; according to his theory each person shares the traits of both to limited and varying extents at different times. The archangel has superhuman powers of thought, superhuman knowledge and no weaknesses. This unbiased "ideal observer", when presented with an unfamiliar situation, would be able to immediately scan all potential consequences of all possible actions in order to frame a universal principle from which they could decide an appropriate action for the situation. Such a person would not need a set of intuitive moral rules, as they would be able to decide the correct response to any possible situation by reason alone. By contrast, the prole has these human weaknesses to an extreme degree. They must rely upon intuitions and sound prima facie principles all of the time, as they are incapable of critical thought. The set of intuitive moral rules that the prole follows must be simple and general enough that they can be easily understood and memorised, and also quick and easy to use.

Once one has identified the different types of moral thinking, the next step is to identify when one ought to think like an archangel, and when like a prole. Hare identifies three types of situation where critical thinking is necessary. The first is when the intuitive general principles conflict in particular cases. The second is when, "though there is no conflict between principles, there is something highly unusual about the case which prompts the question whether the general principles are really fitted to deal with it."

== Criticisms ==
Apart from the criticisms that are commonly made of utilitarianism in general, there are several criticisms made specifically against two-level utilitarianism.

One objection is that two-level utilitarianism undermines an agent's commitment to act in accordance with his or her moral principles. For example, a theist will comply with their moral code because they see it as based upon God's will. However, a two-level utilitarian knows that their everyday set of moral rules is merely a guideline, and as such any breach of these rules is unlikely to accompany the same degree of guilt as would someone who believed that it was wrong in principle to act in that way.

David McNaughton argues that, even if the agent's commitment to their principles is not undermined, two-level utilitarianism does not succeed in its goal of showing, "how, on utilitarian principles, it is a good idea to think and reason in a pluralist and non-consequentialist manner." It is impossible, he claims, to compartmentalise one's thinking in the way the two-level account requires—to simultaneously think like a utilitarian and act in a non-utilitarian way. Hare's response to this type of criticism is that he does his own moral thinking in this way, therefore the challenge that this type of moral thinking is impossible must be false.

A third variety of objection somewhat related to the problem of "weakness of will" is that difficulties arise when trying to keep critical thinking separate from intuitive thinking.

== Applications ==
In Essays on Bioethics (1993), Hare applies the methods of two-level utilitarianism to problems in bioethics such as abortion and the treatment of people with psychiatric disorders using behavior control techniques.
