= Preference utilitarianism =

Topic in ethics

Preference utilitarianism (also known as preferentialism) is a form of utilitarianism in contemporary philosophy. Unlike value monist forms of utilitarianism, preferentialism values actions that fulfill the most personal interests for the entire circle of people affected by said action.

== Description ==
Unlike classical utilitarianism, in which right actions are defined as those that maximize pleasure and minimize pain, preference utilitarianism entails promoting actions that fulfil the interests (i.e., preferences) of those beings involved. Here beings might be rational, that is to say, that their interests have been carefully selected and they have not made some kind of error. However, 'beings' can also be extended to all sentient beings, even those who lack the capacity to contemplate long-term interests and consequences. Since what is good and right depends solely on individual preferences, there can be nothing that is in itself good or bad: for preference utilitarians, the source of both morality and ethics in general is subjective preference. Preference utilitarianism therefore can be distinguished by its acknowledgement that every person's experience of satisfaction is unique.

The theory, as outlined by R. M. Hare in 1981, is controversial, insofar as it presupposes some basis by which a conflict between A's preferences and B's preferences can be resolved (for example, by weighting them mathematically). In a similar vein, Peter Singer, for much of his career a major proponent of preference utilitarianism and himself influenced by the views of Hare, has been criticised for giving priority to the views of beings capable of holding preferences (being able actively to contemplate the future and its interaction with the present) over those solely concerned with their immediate situation, a group that includes young children and some animals. There are, he writes in regard to killing in general, times when "the preference of the victim could sometimes be outweighed by the preferences of others". Singer does, however, still place a high value on the life of rational beings, since killing them does not infringe upon just one of their preferences, but "a wide range of the most central and significant preferences a being can have".

== See also ==
- Act utilitarianism
- R.G. Frey
- Rule utilitarianism
- Two-level utilitarianism
- Preferential option for the poor – Catholic social teaching on the well-being of the poor
