= H. J. McCloskey =

Australian philosopher (1925–2000)

- Born: 1925
- Died: 2000
- Education: University of Melbourne
- Occupation: Philosopher

Henry John McCloskey (1925–2000) was an Australian moral philosopher and writer. McCloskey was Professor of Philosophy at La Trobe University in Melbourne. After graduating from the University of Melbourne, he had appointments at the University of Western Australia and the University of Melbourne before taking up a chair at La Trobe. He was president of the Australasian Association of Philosophy in 1978.

McCloskey is known for his sheriff scenario, a thought experiment he used to criticize "extreme" utilitarianism, or what later came to be known as act utilitarianism. He was married to Mary Agnes McCloskey. McCloskey was an atheist. He argued that the problem of evil provides conclusive evidence against theism. McCloskey was a noted critic of animal rights. McCloskey stated that animals cannot have moral rights but they can be given legal rights.

== Selected publications ==
Articles

- Rights (The Philosophical Quarterly, 1965)
- The Right to Life (Mind, 1975)
- Moral Rights and Animals (Inquiry: An Interdisciplinary Journal of Philosophy, 1979)

Books

- Morality Without Religion (1961)
- The Problem of Liberalism (1965)
- Utilitarian and Retributive Punishment (1967)
- Meta-ethics and Normative Ethics (1969)
- The Political Philosophy of Liberalism (1973)
- John Stuart Mill: A Critical Study (1971)
- God and Evil (1974)
- Ecological Ethics and Politics (1983)
