= Alastair Norcross =

American academic

Education
- Education: Syracuse University, Oxford University

Philosophical work
- Era: Contemporary philosophy
- Region: Western philosophy
- School: Analytic philosophy
- Main interests: normative ethics, applied ethics
- Notable ideas: scalar utilitarianism

Alastair Norcross is a professor of philosophy at the University of Colorado at Boulder, specializing in normative ethics, applied ethics, and political philosophy. He is a defender of utilitarianism.

== Education and career ==
Norcross graduated from Oxford University in 1983 and earned his Ph.D. at Syracuse University in 1991 under the supervision of Jonathan Bennett. While finishing his degree, he also taught at Hobart and William Smith Colleges in Geneva, NY from 1990 to 1992. He then taught for ten years at Southern Methodist University in Dallas, before moving to Rice University in 2002. He joined the Colorado faculty in 2007.

== Philosophical work ==
In ethics, Norcross defends a version of act utilitarianism known as scalar utilitarianism, which is the theory that there are no right or wrong actions, only better or worse actions ranked along a continuum from the action (or actions) that contributes most to overall utility to the action (or actions) that contributes the least.

== On factory farming ==
In his 2004 paper, Puppies, Pigs, and People: Eating Meat and Marginal Cases, Norcross invoked a thought experiment termed "Fred’s Basement" which argued that consuming factory farmed meat is morally equivalent to torturing and killing puppies because both knowingly cause unnecessary harm to sentient creatures just for trivial pleasures.

Norcross left open the possibility that consuming humanely-raised meat is permissible, whilst some of his readers have contended that his argumentative approach rules it out.

== Selected articles ==
- (2006) 'Scalar Act-Utilitarianism'. In Henry R. West (ed.) Blackwell Guide to Mill's Utilitarianism. ISBN 978-1-4051-1949-8
- (2006) 'Reasons Without Demands: Rethinking Rightness'. In Jamie Dreier (ed.) Contemporary Debates in Moral Theory. ISBN 978-1-4051-0179-0
- (2005) 'Peacemaking Philosophy or Appeasement? Sterba's Argument for Compromise'. International Journal of Applied Philosophy, 19:2.
- (2005) 'Contextualism for Consequentialists'. Acta Analytica, 20(2).
- (2005) 'Harming in Context'. Philosophical Studies, 123 (1-2).
- (2004) 'Puppies, Pigs, and People: Eating Meat and Marginal Cases'. Philosophical Perspectives 18.
- (2003) 'Killing and Letting Die'. In R. G. Frey and Christopher Heath Wellman (eds.), The Blackwell Companion to Applied Ethics: 451–463.
- (2002) 'Contractualism and Aggregation'. Social Theory and Practice, 28 (2): 303–314.
- (1999) 'Intransitivity and the Person-Affecting Principle'. Philosophy and Phenomenological Research, LIX (3): 769–776.
- (1998) 'Great Harms from Small Benefits Grow: How Death can be Outweighed by Headaches'. Analysis: 152–158.
