= Happiness pump =

Philosophical thought experiment

A happiness pump is a philosophical thought experiment. It is a critique of utilitarianism. A happiness pump is someone who will do anything to increase other people's well-being even if it reduces their own well-being significantly. They have turned themselves into a machine (a "pump") that makes happiness.

Utilitarianism states that actions that make more happiness or less pain are good and actions that reduce happiness or increase pain are bad and treats them as measurable and discrete. In utilitarianism, it does not matter who is becoming happier or feeling less pain. The happiness pump is a person who has taken utilitarianism too far and will give themselves great pain so long as they believe it makes other people somewhere in the world much happier.

Philosopher Joshua David Greene says it is almost impossible for a happiness pump to exist in real life because anyone who tried would give up very shortly.

Relatedly, philosopher Susan Wolf argues that an individual who was maximally morally good would also be in some ways intolerable to be around, complicating the view that being a happiness pump is possible.

== In popular culture ==
A happiness pump character, Doug Forcett, appears in one episode of the television show The Good Place. He is a man who accidentally received an insight into the rules of the afterlife while using psychedelic drugs, and he decides to have a torturously ascetic life devoid of anything that could cause suffering or even inconvenience of other living beings, but for the selfish reason of being admitted into the "Good Place", the paradise afterlife.

== See also ==
- The Ones Who Walk Away from Omelas
- Utility monster
