= Rule egoism =

Selecting rules that most benefit the self

Rule egoism is the doctrine under which an individual evaluates the optimal set of rules based on whether conformity to those rules would bring the most benefit to themselves. An action, therefore, is right if it promotes one's welfare at least as well as any alternative rule available to them. It is associated with foundational egoism, which maintains that normative factors must be grounded in consideration of the agent's well-being - something that rule egoism does but in a way that avoids factoral egoism.

== Development ==
Although it is claimed that Thomas Hobbes is a rule-egoist, the term "rule egoism" was first coined by Richard Brandt in his work "Rationality, Egoism, and Morality, where it was briefly mentioned.

== See also ==
- Enlightened self-interest
- Ethical egoism
- Psychological egoism
- Rational egoism
- Rule utilitarianism
- Virtue ethics
