= Act utilitarianism =

Flavour of utilitarianism

Act utilitarianism is a utilitarian theory of ethics that states that the morally right action is the one that produces the best results in that specific situation.

== Overview ==
Utilitarianism is based on the principle of utility, described by Jeremy Bentham as "the greatest happiness for the greatest number". Bentham supported this hedonistic theory with another famous quote of his, that "Nature has placed mankind under two sovereign masters, pain and pleasure. It is for them alone to point out what we ought to do, as well as determine what we shall do." Bentham and other classical utilitarians such as John Stuart Mill and Henry Sidgwick define happiness as pleasure and the absence of pain.

Critics sometimes cite such prohibitions on leisure activities as a problem for act utilitarianism. Critics also cite more significant problems, such as the fact that act utilitarianism seems to imply that specific acts of torture or enslavement would be morally permissible if they produced enough happiness.

Act utilitarianism is often contrasted with a different theory called rule utilitarianism. Rule utilitarianism states that the morally right action is the one that is in accordance with a moral rule whose general observance would create the most happiness. Act utilitarianism evaluates an act by its actual consequences whereas rule utilitarianism evaluates an action by the consequences of its general or universal practice (by all other persons, and perhaps into the future and past as well). Rule utilitarianism is sometimes thought to avoid the problems associated with act utilitarianism.

== See also ==
- Brad Hooker
- Peter Singer
- Preference utilitarianism
- Two-level utilitarianism
