= Brad Hooker =

American philosopher (born 1957)

- Born: 13 September 1957 (age 69)

Education
- Thesis: Why should I be moral? (1986)
- Doctoral advisor: Derek Parfit

Philosophical work
- Era: Contemporary philosophy
- Region: Western philosophy
- School: Analytic; Consequentialism
- Main interests: Moral philosophy

Brad Hooker (born 13 September 1957) is an American philosopher who specialises in moral philosophy. He is a professor at the University of Reading and is best known for his work defending rule consequentialism (often treated as being synonymous with rule utilitarianism).

His book Ideal Code, Real World received a number of favourable reviews from high-profile philosophers. Derek Parfit, for example, wrote: "This book seems to me the best statement and defence, so far, of one of the most important moral theories."

== Education ==
Hooker initially studied philosophy at Princeton University before pursuing his BPhil and DPhil at the University of Oxford from 1981 to 1986, where he was a member of St Anne's College, and was taught and supervised by Parfit, James Griffin, and Richard Hare.

== Hooker's rule-consequentialism ==
One of the most common objections to rule-consequentialism is that it is incoherent, because it is based on the consequentialist principle that we should be concerned with maximising the good, but then tells us not to act to maximise the good, but to follow rules (even in cases where we know that breaking the rule could produce better results).

Hooker avoids this objection by not basing his form of rule-consequentialism on the ideal of maximising the good. He writes:

...the best argument for rule-consequentialism is not that it derives from an overarching commitment to maximise the good. The best argument for rule-consequentialism is that it does a better job than its rivals of matching and tying together our moral convictions, as well as offering us help with our moral disagreements and uncertainties.

== Selected bibliography ==
=== Books ===
- Hooker, Brad (1994). Rationality, rules, and utility: new essays on the moral philosophy of Richard B. Brandt. Boulder: Westview Press. ISBN 9780813315683.
- Hooker, Brad; Little, Margaret Olivia (2000). Moral particularism. Oxford New York: Clarendon Press Oxford University Press. ISBN 9780198238836.
- Hooker, Brad; Crisp, Roger (2000). Well-being and morality: essays in honour of James Griffin. Oxford New York: Clarendon Press Oxford University Press. ISBN 9780198235842.
- Hooker, Brad (2000). Ideal code, real world a rule-consequentialist theory of morality. Oxford New York: Clarendon Press Oxford University Press. ISBN 9780199256570.

Reviewed in: Driver, Julia (3 June 2002). "Book review: Brad Hooker, Ideal code, real world". Notre Dame Philosophical Reviews. College of Arts and Letters, University of Notre Dame.

- Hooker, Brad (2012). Developing deontology: new essays in ethical theory. Malden, Mass: Wiley-Blackwell. ISBN 9781444361940.
- Hooker, Brad; Little, Margaret Olivia; Bakhurst, David (2013). Thinking about reasons: themes from the philosophy of Jonathan Dancy. Oxford, United Kingdom: Oxford University Press. ISBN 9780199604678.

=== Chapters in books ===
- Hooker, Brad (9 January 2008) [31 December 2003]. "Rule Consequentialism (definition)". Stanford Encyclopedia of Philosophy - online.

=== Journal articles ===
- Hooker, Brad (Summer 2002). "Kant's normative ethics" (PDF). The Richmond Journal of Philosophy. 1 (1). Twickenham, United Kingdom: Philosophy Department, Richmond upon Thames College: 17–22. Pdf of individual article.

=== Podcast ===
- Brad Hooker (3 September 2007). Brad Hooker on consequentialism (Podcast). Philosophy bites. Philosophy bites.

Professional and academic associations
Preceded by The Baroness O'Neill of Bengarve	President of the British Philosophical Association; 2006–2009	Succeeded by M. M. McCabe
