= Utilitarianism =

Ethical theory based on maximizing well-being

Utilitarianism is a family of theories in normative ethics that prescribe actions that maximize happiness and well-being for all affected individuals. Utilitarian ideas encourage actions that lead to the greatest good for the greatest number. Although different varieties of utilitarianism admit different characterizations, the basic idea that underpins them all is, in some sense, to maximize utility, which is often defined in terms of well-being or related concepts. For instance, Jeremy Bentham, the founder of utilitarianism, described utility as the capacity of actions or objects to produce benefits, such as pleasure, happiness, and good, or to prevent harm, such as pain and unhappiness, to those affected.

Utilitarianism is a version of consequentialism, which states that the consequences of any action are the only standard of right and wrong. Unlike other forms of consequentialism, such as egoism and altruism, egalitarian utilitarianism considers either the interests of all humanity or all sentient beings equally. Proponents of utilitarianism have disagreed on a number of issues, such as whether actions should be chosen based on their likely results (act utilitarianism), or whether agents should conform to rules that maximize utility (rule utilitarianism). There is also disagreement as to whether total utility (total utilitarianism) or average utility (average utilitarianism) should be maximized.

The seeds of the theory can be found in the hedonists Aristippus and Epicurus who viewed happiness as the only good, the state consequentialism of the ancient Chinese philosopher Mozi who developed a theory to maximize benefit and minimize harm, and in the work of the medieval Indian philosopher Shantideva. The tradition of modern utilitarianism began with Jeremy Bentham, and continued with such philosophers as John Stuart Mill, Henry Sidgwick, R. M. Hare, and Peter Singer. The concept has been applied towards social welfare economics, questions of justice, the crisis of global poverty, the ethics of raising animals for food, and the importance of avoiding existential risks to humanity.

== Etymology ==
Benthamism, the utilitarian philosophy founded by Jeremy Bentham, was substantially modified by his successor John Stuart Mill, who popularized the term utilitarianism. In 1861, Mill noted that he had "reason for believing himself to be the first person who brought the word utilitarian into use", although he "did not invent it, but adopted it from a passing expression" in John Galt's 1821 novel Annals of the Parish. However, Mill seems to have been unaware that Bentham had used the term utilitarian in his 1781 letter to George Wilson and his 1802 letter to Étienne Dumont.

== Historical background ==
=== Pre-modern formulations ===
The importance of happiness as an end for humans has long been argued. Forms of hedonism were put forward by the ancient Greek philosophers Aristippus and Epicurus. Aristotle argued that eudaimonia is the highest human good. Augustine wrote that "all men agree in desiring the last end, which is happiness". The idea that conduct should be judged by its consequences also existed within the ancient world. Consequentialist theories were first developed by the ancient Chinese philosopher Mozi, who proposed a system that sought to maximize benefit and eliminate harm. Mohist consequentialism advocated communitarian moral goods, including political stability, population growth, and wealth, but did not support the utilitarian notion of maximizing individual happiness.

Utilitarian ideas can also be found in the work of medieval philosophers. In medieval India, the 8th-century philosopher Śāntideva wrote that humanity ought "to stop all the present and future pain and suffering of all sentient beings, and to bring about all present and future pleasure and happiness." In medieval Europe, happiness was explored in depth by Thomas Aquinas in his Summa Theologica. During the Renaissance, one author whose work incorporated consequentialist ideas was the political philosopher Niccolò Machiavelli.

=== 18th century ===
Utilitarianism as a distinct ethical position only emerged in the 18th century, and although it is usually thought to have begun with Jeremy Bentham, some earlier writers presented similar theories.

==== Hutcheson ====
Francis Hutcheson first introduced a key utilitarian phrase in An Inquiry into the Original of Our Ideas of Beauty and Virtue (1725): when choosing the most moral action, the amount of virtue in a particular action is proportionate to the number of people it brings happiness to. In the same way, moral evil, or vice, is proportionate to the number of people made to suffer. The best action is the one that procures the greatest happiness to the greatest numbers, and the worst is the one that causes the most misery. In the first three editions of the book, Hutcheson included various mathematical algorithms "to compute the Morality of any Actions". In doing so, he echoed the later-proposed hedonic calculus of Bentham.

==== John Gay ====
Some claim that John Gay developed the first systematic theory of utilitarian ethics. In Concerning the Fundamental Principle of Virtue or Morality (1731), Gay argues that:

happiness, private happiness, is the proper or ultimate end of all our actions... each particular action may be said to have its proper and peculiar end…(but)…they still tend or ought to tend to something farther; as is evident from hence, viz. that a man may ask and expect a reason why either of them are pursued: now to ask the reason of any action or pursuit, is only to enquire into the end of it: but to expect a reason, i.e. an end, to be assigned for an ultimate end, is absurd. To ask why I pursue happiness, will admit of no other answer than an explanation of the terms.

This pursuit of happiness is given a theological basis:

Now it is evident from the nature of God, viz. his being infinitely happy in himself from all eternity, and from his goodness manifested in his works, that he could have no other design in creating mankind than their happiness; and therefore he wills their happiness; therefore the means of their happiness: therefore that my behaviour, as far as it may be a means of the happiness of mankind, should be such...thus the will of God is the immediate criterion of Virtue, and the happiness of mankind the criterion of the will of God; and therefore the happiness of mankind may be said to be the criterion of virtue, but once removed…(and)…I am to do whatever lies in my power towards promoting the happiness of mankind.

==== Hume ====
In An Enquiry Concerning the Principles of Morals (1751), David Hume writes:

In all determinations of morality, this circumstance of public utility is ever principally in view; and wherever disputes arise, either in philosophy or common life, concerning the bounds of duty, the question cannot, by any means, be decided with greater certainty, than by ascertaining, on any side, the true interests of mankind. If any false opinion, embraced from appearances, has been found to prevail; as soon as farther experience and sounder reasoning have given us juster notions of human affairs, we retract our first sentiment, and adjust anew the boundaries of moral good and evil.

==== Paley ====
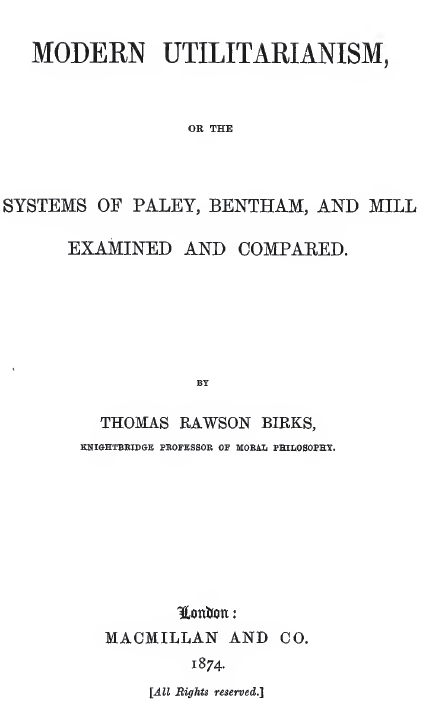
Modern Utilitarianism by Thomas Rawson Birks, 1874

Gay's theological utilitarianism was developed and popularized by William Paley. It has been claimed that Paley was not a very original thinker and that the philosophies in his treatise on ethics is "an assemblage of ideas developed by others and is presented to be learned by students rather than debated by colleagues." Nevertheless, his book The Principles of Moral and Political Philosophy (1785) was a required text at Cambridge and Smith (1954) says that Paley's writings were "once as well known in American colleges as were the readers and spellers of William McGuffey and Noah Webster in the elementary schools." Schneewind (1977) writes that "utilitarianism first became widely known in England through the work of William Paley."

The now-forgotten significance of Paley can be judged from the title of Thomas Rawson Birks's 1874 work Modern Utilitarianism or the Systems of Paley, Bentham and Mill Examined and Compared.

Apart from restating that happiness as an end is grounded in the nature of God, Paley also discusses the place of rules, writing:

[A]ctions are to be estimated by their tendency. Whatever is expedient, is right. It is the utility of any moral rule alone, which constitutes the obligation of it.

But to all this there seems a plain objection, viz. that many actions are useful, which no man in his senses will allow to be right. There are occasions, in which the hand of the assassin would be very useful. ... The true answer is this; that these actions, after all, are not useful, and for that reason, and that alone, are not right.

To see this point perfectly, it must be observed that the bad consequences of actions are twofold, particular and general. The particular bad consequence of an action, is the mischief which that single action directly and immediately occasions. The general bad consequence is, the violation of some necessary or useful general rule. ...

You cannot permit one action and forbid another, without showing a difference between them. Consequently, the same sort of actions must be generally permitted or generally forbidden. Where, therefore, the general permission of them would be pernicious, it becomes necessary to lay down and support the rule which generally forbids them.

== Classical utilitarianism ==
=== Jeremy Bentham ===
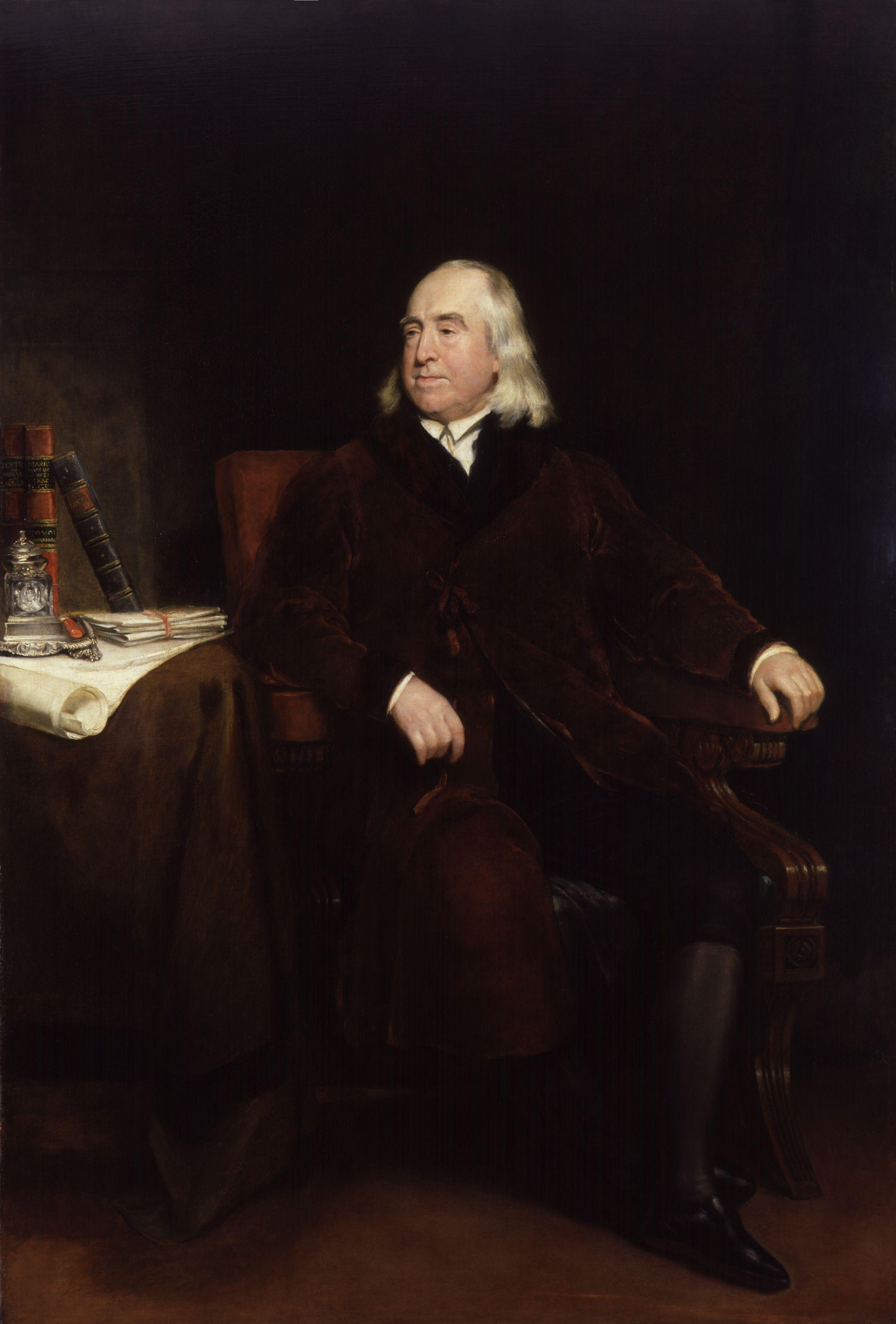
Portrait of Bentham by Henry William Pickersgill

Bentham's book An Introduction to the Principles of Morals and Legislation was printed in 1780 but not published until 1789. It is possible that Bentham decided to publish after he saw the success of English philosopher William Paley's Principles of Moral and Political Philosophy. Though Bentham's book was not an immediate success, his ideas were spread further when Pierre Étienne Louis Dumont translated edited selections from a variety of Bentham's manuscripts into French. Traité de législation civile et pénale was published in 1802 and then later retranslated back into English by Hildreth as The Theory of Legislation, although by this time significant portions of Dumont's work had already been retranslated and incorporated into Sir John Bowring's edition of Bentham's works, which was issued in parts between 1838 and 1843.

Perhaps aware that Francis Hutcheson eventually removed his algorithms for calculating the greatest happiness because they "appear'd useless, and were disagreeable to some readers", Bentham contends that there is nothing novel or unwarranted about his method, for "in all this there is nothing but what the practice of mankind, wheresoever they have a clear view of their own interest, is perfectly conformable to."

Rosen (2003) warns that descriptions of utilitarianism can bear "little resemblance historically to utilitarians like Bentham and J. S. Mill" and can be more "a crude version of act utilitarianism conceived in the twentieth century as a straw man to be attacked and rejected." It is a mistake to think that Bentham is not concerned with rules. His seminal work is concerned with the principles of legislation and the hedonic calculus is introduced with the words "Pleasures then, and the avoidance of pains, are the ends that the legislator has in view." In Chapter VII, Bentham says: "The business of government is to promote the happiness of the society, by punishing and rewarding.... In proportion as an act tends to disturb that happiness, in proportion as the tendency of it is pernicious, will be the demand it creates for punishment."

==== Principle of utility ====
Bentham's work opens with a statement of the principle of utility:

Nature has placed mankind under the governance of two sovereign masters, pain and pleasure. It is for them alone to point out what we ought to do. ... By the principle of utility is meant that principle which approves or disapproves of every action whatsoever according to the tendency it appears to have to augment or diminish the happiness of the party whose interest is in question: or, what is the same thing in other words to promote or to oppose that happiness. I say of every action whatsoever, and therefore not only of every action of a private individual, but of every measure of government.

==== Hedonic calculus ====
In Chapter IV, Bentham proposes a method of calculating the value of pleasures and pains, which has come to be known as the hedonic calculus. Bentham says that the value of a pleasure or pain, considered by itself, can be measured according to its intensity, duration, certainty/uncertainty and propinquity/remoteness. In addition, it is necessary to consider "the tendency of any act by which it is produced" and, therefore, to take account of the act's fecundity, or the chance it has of being followed by sensations of the same kind and its purity, or the chance it has of not being followed by sensations of the opposite kind. Finally, it is necessary to consider the extent, or the number of people affected by the action.

==== Evils of the first and second order ====
The question then arises as to when, if at all, it might be legitimate to break the law. This is considered in The Theory of Legislation, where Bentham distinguishes between evils of the first and second order. The former are more immediate consequences; the latter are consequences spread through the community causing "alarm" and "danger".

It is true there are cases in which, if we confine ourselves to the effects of the first order, the good will have an incontestable preponderance over the evil. Were the offence considered only under this point of view, it would not be easy to assign any good reasons to justify the rigour of the laws. Every thing depends upon the evil of the second order; it is this which gives to such actions the character of crime, and which makes punishment necessary. Let us take, for example, the physical desire of satisfying hunger. Let a beggar, pressed by hunger, steal from a rich man's house a loaf, which perhaps saves him from starving, can it be possible to compare the good which the thief acquires for himself, with the evil which the rich man suffers?... It is not on account of the evil of the first order that it is necessary to erect these actions into offences, but on account of the evil of the second order.

=== John Stuart Mill ===
Mill was brought up as a Benthamite with the explicit intention that he would carry on the cause of utilitarianism. Mill's book Utilitarianism first appeared as a series of three articles published in Fraser's Magazine in 1861 and was reprinted as a single book in 1863.

==== Higher and lower pleasures ====
Mill rejects a purely quantitative measurement of utility and says:

It is quite compatible with the principle of utility to recognize the fact, that some kinds of pleasure are more desirable and more valuable than others. It would be absurd that while, in estimating all other things, quality is considered as well as quantity, the estimation of pleasures should be supposed to depend on quantity alone.

The word utility is used to mean general well-being or happiness, and Mill's view is that utility is the consequence of a good action. Utility, within the context of utilitarianism, refers to people performing actions for social utility. By social utility, he means the well-being of many people. Mill's explanation of the concept of utility in his work, Utilitarianism, is that people truly desire happiness, and since each individual desires their own happiness, it must follow that all of us desire the happiness of everyone, contributing to a larger social utility. Thus, an action that results in the greatest pleasure for the utility of society is the best action, or as Jeremy Bentham, the founder of early Utilitarianism put it, as the greatest happiness of the greatest number.

Mill not only viewed actions as a core part of utility, but as the directive rule of moral human conduct; that is, the rule is that people should only be committing actions that provide pleasure to society. This view of pleasure was hedonistic, as it pursued the thought that pleasure is the highest good in life. This concept was adopted by Bentham and can be seen in his works. According to Mill, good actions result in pleasure, and that there is no higher end than pleasure. Mill says that good actions lead to pleasure and define good character. Better put, the justification of character, and whether an action is good or not, is based on how the person contributes to the concept of social utility. In the long run the best proof of a good character is good actions; and resolutely refuse to consider any mental disposition as good, of which the predominant tendency is to produce bad conduct. In the last chapter of Utilitarianism, Mill concludes that justice, as a classifying factor of our actions (being just or unjust) is one of the certain moral requirements, and when the requirements are all regarded collectively, they are viewed as greater according to this scale of "social utility" as Mill puts it.

He also notes that, contrary to what its critics might say, there is "no known Epicurean theory of life which does not assign to the pleasures of the intellect ... a much higher value as pleasures than to those of mere sensation." However, he accepts that this is usually because the intellectual pleasures are thought to have circumstantial advantages, i.e. "greater permanency, safety, uncostliness, &c". Instead, Mill will argue that some pleasures are intrinsically better than others.

The accusation that hedonism is a "doctrine worthy only of swine" has a long history. In Nicomachean Ethics (Book 1 Chapter 5), Aristotle says that identifying the good with pleasure is to prefer a life suitable for beasts. The theological utilitarians had the option of grounding their pursuit of happiness in the will of God; the hedonistic utilitarians needed a different defence. Mill's approach is to argue that the pleasures of the intellect are intrinsically superior to physical pleasures.

Few human creatures would consent to be changed into any of the lower animals, for a promise of the fullest allowance of a beast's pleasures; no intelligent human being would consent to be a fool, no instructed person would be an ignoramus, no person of feeling and conscience would be selfish and base, even though they should be persuaded that the fool, the dunce, or the rascal is better satisfied with his lot than they are with theirs. ... A being of higher faculties requires more to make him happy, is capable probably of more acute suffering, and certainly accessible to it at more points, than one of an inferior type; but in spite of these liabilities, he can never really wish to sink into what he feels to be a lower grade of existence. ... It is better to be a human being dissatisfied than a pig satisfied; better to be Socrates dissatisfied than a fool satisfied. And if the fool, or the pig, are of a different opinion, it is because they only know their own side of the question...

Mill argues that if people who are "competently acquainted" with two pleasures show a decided preference for one even if it be accompanied by more discontent and "would not resign it for any quantity of the other", then it is legitimate to regard that pleasure as being superior in quality. Mill recognizes that these "competent judges" will not always agree, and states that, in cases of disagreement, the judgment of the majority is to be accepted as final. Mill also acknowledges that "many who are capable of the higher pleasures, occasionally, under the influence of temptation, postpone them to the lower. But this is quite compatible with a full appreciation of the intrinsic superiority of the higher." Mill says that this appeal to those who have experienced the relevant pleasures is no different from what must happen when assessing the quantity of pleasure, for there is no other way of measuring "the acutest of two pains, or the intensest of two pleasurable sensations." "It is indisputable that the being whose capacities of enjoyment are low, has the greatest chance of having them fully satisfied; and a highly-endowed being will always feel that any happiness which he can look for, as the world is constitute, is imperfect."

Mill also thinks that "intellectual pursuits have value out of proportion to the amount of contentment or pleasure (the mental state) that they produce." Mill also says that people should pursue these grand ideals, because if they choose to have gratification from petty pleasures, "some displeasure will eventually creep in. We will become bored and depressed." Mill claims that gratification from petty pleasures only gives short-term happiness and, subsequently, worsens the individual who may feel that his life lacks happiness, since the happiness is transient. Whereas, intellectual pursuits give long-term happiness because they provide the individual with constant opportunities throughout the years to improve his life, by benefiting from accruing knowledge. Mill views intellectual pursuits as "capable of incorporating the 'finer things' in life" while petty pursuits do not achieve this goal. Mill is saying that intellectual pursuits give the individual the opportunity to escape the constant depression cycle since these pursuits allow them to achieve their ideals, while petty pleasures do not offer this. Although debate persists about the nature of Mill's view of gratification, this suggests bifurcation in his position.

==== 'Proving' the principle of utility ====
In Chapter Four of Utilitarianism, Mill considers what proof can be given for the principle of utility:

The only proof capable of being given that an object is visible, is that people actually see it. The only proof that a sound is audible, is that people hear it. ... In like manner, I apprehend, the sole evidence it is possible to produce that anything is desirable, is that people do actually desire it. ... No reason can be given why the general happiness is desirable, except that each person, so far as he believes it to be attainable, desires his own happiness...we have not only all the proof which the case admits of, but all which it is possible to require, that happiness is a good: that each person's happiness is a good to that person, and the general happiness, therefore, a good to the aggregate of all persons.

It is usual to say that Mill is committing a number of fallacies:

- naturalistic fallacy: Mill is trying to deduce what people ought to do from what they in fact do;
- equivocation fallacy: Mill moves from the fact that (1) something is desirable, i.e. is capable of being desired, to the claim that (2) it is desirable, i.e. that it ought to be desired; and
- the fallacy of composition: the fact that people desire their own happiness does not imply that the aggregate of all persons will desire the general happiness.

Such allegations began to emerge in Mill's lifetime, shortly after the publication of Utilitarianism, and persisted for well over a century, though the tide has been turning in recent discussions. Nonetheless, a defence of Mill against all three charges, with a chapter devoted to each, can be found in Necip Fikri Alican's Mill's Principle of Utility: A Defense of John Stuart Mill's Notorious Proof (1994). This is the first, and remains the only, book-length treatment of the subject matter. Yet the alleged fallacies in the proof continue to attract scholarly attention in journal articles and book chapters.

Hall (1949) and Popkin (1950) defend Mill against this accusation pointing out that he begins Chapter Four by asserting that "questions of ultimate ends do not admit of proof, in the ordinary acceptation of the term" and that this is "common to all first principles". Therefore, according to Hall and Popkin, Mill does not attempt to "establish that what people do desire is desirable but merely attempts to make the principles acceptable." The type of "proof" Mill is offering "consists only of some considerations which, Mill thought, might induce an honest and reasonable man to accept utilitarianism."

Having claimed that people do, in fact, desire happiness, Mill now has to show that it is the only thing they desire. Mill anticipates the objection that people desire other things such as virtue. He argues that whilst people might start desiring virtue as a means to happiness, eventually, it becomes part of someone's happiness and is then desired as an end in itself.

The principle of utility does not mean that any given pleasure, as music, for instance, or any given exemption from pain, as for example health, are to be looked upon as means to a collective something termed happiness, and to be desired on that account. They are desired and desirable in and for themselves; besides being means, they are a part of the end. Virtue, according to the utilitarian doctrine, is not naturally and originally part of the end, but it is capable of becoming so; and in those who love it disinterestedly it has become so, and is desired and cherished, not as a means to happiness, but as a part of their happiness.

We may give what explanation we please of this unwillingness; we may attribute it to pride, a name which is given indiscriminately to some of the most and to some of the least estimable feelings of which is mankind are capable; we may refer it to the love of liberty and personal independence, an appeal to which was with the Stoics one of the most effective means for the inculcation of it; to the love of power, or the love of excitement, both of which do really enter into and contribute to it: but its most appropriate appellation is a sense of dignity, which all humans beings possess in one form or other, and in some, though by no means in exact, proportion to their higher faculties, and which is so essential a part of the happiness of those in whom it is strong, that nothing which conflicts with it could be, otherwise than momentarily, an object of desire to them.

=== Henry Sidgwick ===
Sidgwick's book The Methods of Ethics has been referred to as the peak or culmination of classical utilitarianism. His main goal in this book is to ground utilitarianism in the principles of common-sense morality and thereby dispense with the doubts of his predecessors that these two are at odds with each other. For Sidgwick, ethics is about which actions are objectively right. Our knowledge of right and wrong arises from common-sense morality, which lacks a coherent principle at its core. The task of philosophy in general and ethics in particular is not so much to create new knowledge but to systematize existing knowledge. Sidgwick tries to achieve this by formulating methods of ethics, which he defines as rational procedures "for determining right conduct in any particular case". He identifies three methods: intuitionism, which involves various independently valid moral principles to determine what ought to be done, and two forms of hedonism, in which rightness only depends on the pleasure and pain following from the action. Hedonism is subdivided into egoistic hedonism, which only takes the agent's own well-being into account, and universal hedonism or utilitarianism, which is concerned with everyone's well-being.

Intuitionism holds that humans have intuitive, i.e. non-inferential, knowledge of moral principles, which are self-evident to the knower. The criteria for this type of knowledge include that they are expressed in clear terms, that the different principles are mutually consistent with each other and that there is expert consensus on them. According to Sidgwick, commonsense moral principles fail to pass this test, but there are some more abstract principles that pass it, like that "what is right for me must be right for all persons in precisely similar circumstances" or that "one should be equally concerned with all temporal parts of one's life". The most general principles arrived at this way are all compatible with utilitarianism, which is why Sidgwick sees a harmony between intuitionism and utilitarianism. There are also less general intuitive principles, like the duty to keep one's promises or to be just, but these principles are not universal and there are cases where different duties stand in conflict with each other. Sidgwick suggests that such conflicts can be resolved in a utilitarian fashion by considering the consequences of the conflicting actions.

The harmony between intuitionism and utilitarianism is a partial success in Sidgwick's overall project, but he sees full success impossible since egoism, which he considers as equally rational, cannot be reconciled with utilitarianism unless religious assumptions are introduced. Such assumptions, for example, the existence of a personal God who rewards and punishes the agent in the afterlife, could reconcile egoism and utilitarianism. But without them, we have to admit a "dualism of practical reason" that constitutes a "fundamental contradiction" in our moral consciousness.

== Developments in the 20th century ==
=== Ideal utilitarianism ===
The description of ideal utilitarianism was first used by Hastings Rashdall in The Theory of Good and Evil (1907), but it is more often associated with G. E. Moore. In Ethics (1912), Moore rejects a purely hedonistic utilitarianism and argues that there is a range of values that might be maximized. Moore's strategy was to show that it is intuitively implausible that pleasure is the sole measure of what is good. He says that such an assumption:

involves our saying, for instance, that a world in which absolutely nothing except pleasure existed—no knowledge, no love, no enjoyment of beauty, no moral qualities—must yet be intrinsically better—better worth creating—provided only the total quantity of pleasure in it were the least bit greater, than one in which all these things existed as well as pleasure. It involves our saying that, even if the total quantity of pleasure in each was exactly equal, yet the fact that all the beings in the one possessed, in addition knowledge of many different kinds and a full appreciation of all that was beautiful or worthy of love in their world, whereas none of the beings in the other possessed any of these things, would give us no reason whatever for preferring the former to the latter.

Moore admits that it is impossible to prove the case either way, but he believed that it was intuitively obvious that even if the amount of pleasure stayed the same a world that contained such things as beauty and love would be a better world. He adds that, if a person was to take the contrary view, then "I think it is self-evident that he would be wrong."

=== Act and rule utilitarianism ===
In the mid-20th century, a number of philosophers focused on the place of rules in utilitarian thought. It was already considered necessary to use rules to help choose the right action, because estimating the consequences every time seemed error-prone and unlikely to bring the best outcome. Paley had justified the use of rules and Mill says:

It is truly a whimsical supposition that, if mankind were agreed in considering utility to be the test of morality, they would remain without any agreement as to what is useful, and would take no measures for having their notions on the subject taught to the young, and enforced by law and opinion... to consider the rules of morality as improvable, is one thing; to pass over the intermediate generalisations entirely, and endeavour to test each individual action directly by the first principle, is another.… The proposition that happiness is the end and aim of morality, does not mean that no road ought to be laid down to that goal. ... Nobody argues that the art of navigation is not founded on astronomy, because sailors cannot wait to calculate the Nautical Almanack. Being rational creatures, they go to sea with it ready calculated; and all rational creatures go out upon the sea of life with their minds made up on the common questions of right and wrong.

However, rule utilitarianism proposes a more central role for rules that was thought to rescue the theory from some of its more devastating criticisms, particularly problems to do with justice and promise keeping. Smart (1956) and McCloskey (1957) initially use the terms extreme and restricted utilitarianism but eventually settled on the prefixes act and rule instead. Likewise, throughout the 1950s and 1960s, articles were published both for and against the new form of utilitarianism, and through this debate the theory now known as rule utilitarianism was created. In an introduction to an anthology of these articles, the editor was able to say: "The development of this theory was a dialectical process of formulation, criticism, reply and reformulation; the record of this process well illustrates the co-operative development of a philosophical theory."

The essential difference is in what determines whether or not an action is the right action. Act utilitarianism maintains that an action is right if it maximizes utility; rule utilitarianism maintains that an action is right if it conforms to a rule that maximizes utility.

In 1956, Urmson (1953) published an influential article arguing that Mill justified rules on utilitarian principles. From then on, articles have debated this interpretation of Mill. In all probability, it was not a distinction that Mill was particularly trying to make and so the evidence in his writing is inevitably mixed. A collection of Mill's writing published in 1977 includes a letter that seems to tip the balance in favour of the notion that Mill is best classified as an act utilitarian. In the letter, Mill says:

I agree with you that the right way of testing actions by their consequences, is to test them by the natural consequences of the particular action, and not by those which would follow if everyone did the same. But, for the most part, the consideration of what would happen if everyone did the same, is the only means we have of discovering the tendency of the act in the particular case.

Some school level textbooks and at least one British examination board make a further distinction between strong and weak rule utilitarianism. However, it is not clear that this distinction is made in the academic literature. It has been argued that rule utilitarianism collapses into act utilitarianism, because for any given rule, in the case where breaking the rule produces more utility, the rule can be refined by the addition of a sub-rule that handles cases like the exception. This process holds for all cases of exceptions, and so the "rules" have as many "sub-rules" as there are exceptional cases, which, in the end, makes an agent seek out whatever outcome produces the maximum utility.

=== Two-level utilitarianism ===
In Principles (1973), R. M. Hare accepts that rule utilitarianism collapses into act utilitarianism but claims that this is a result of allowing the rules to be "as specific and un-general as we please." He argues that one of the main reasons for introducing rule utilitarianism was to do justice to the general rules that people need for moral education and character development and he proposes that "a difference between act-utilitarianism and rule-utilitarianism can be introduced by limiting the specificity of the rules, i.e., by increasing their generality." This distinction between a "specific rule utilitarianism" (which collapses into act utilitarianism) and "general rule utilitarianism" forms the basis of Hare's two-level utilitarianism.

When people "play God or take on the role of the ideal observer", they use the specific form, and this needs to be done when deciding what general principles to teach and follow. When people are "inculcating" or find themselves in situations where the biases of human nature are likely to prevent them from doing the calculations properly, then they should use the more general rule utilitarianism.

Hare argues that in practice, most of the time, people should be following the general principles:

One ought to abide by the general principles whose general inculcation is for the best; harm is more likely to come, in actual moral situations, from questioning these rules than from sticking to them, unless the situations are very extra-ordinary; the results of sophisticated felicific calculations are not likely, human nature and human ignorance being what they are, to lead to the greatest utility.

In Moral Thinking (1981), Hare illustrated the two extremes. The "archangel" is the hypothetical person who has perfect knowledge of the situation and no personal biases or weaknesses and always uses critical moral thinking to decide the right thing to do. In contrast, the "prole" is the hypothetical person who is completely incapable of critical thinking and uses nothing but intuitive moral thinking and, of necessity, has to follow the general moral rules they have been taught or learned through imitation. It is not that some people are archangels and others proles, but rather that "we all share the characteristics of both to limited and varying degrees and at different times."

Hare does not specify when people should think more like an "archangel" and more like a "prole" as this will, in any case, vary from person to person. However, the critical moral thinking underpins and informs the more intuitive moral thinking. It is responsible for formulating and, if necessary, reformulating the general moral rules. People also switch to critical thinking when trying to deal with unusual situations or in cases where the intuitive moral rules give conflicting advice.

=== Preference utilitarianism ===
Preference utilitarianism entails promoting actions that fulfil the preferences of those beings involved. The concept of preference utilitarianism was first proposed in 1977 by John Harsanyi in Morality and the Theory of Rational Behaviour, however the concept is more commonly associated with R. M. Hare, Peter Singer, and Richard Brandt.

Harsanyi claims that his theory is indebted to:

- Adam Smith, who equated the moral point of view with that of an impartial but sympathetic observer;
- Immanuel Kant, who insisted on the criterion of universality, which may also be described as a criterion of reciprocity;
- the classical utilitarians who made maximizing social utility the basic criterion of morality; and
- "the modern theory of rational behaviour under risk and uncertainty, usually described as Bayesian decision theory."

Harsanyi rejects hedonistic utilitarianism as being dependent on an outdated psychology saying that it is far from obvious that everything people do is motivated by a desire to maximize pleasure and minimize pain. He also rejects ideal utilitarianism because "it is certainly not true as an empirical observation that people's only purpose in life is to have 'mental states of intrinsic worth'."

According to Harsanyi, "preference utilitarianism is the only form of utilitarianism consistent with the important philosophical principle of preference autonomy. By this I mean the principle that, in deciding what is good and what is bad for a given individual, the ultimate criterion can only be his own wants and his own preferences."

Harsanyi adds two caveats. Firstly, people sometimes have irrational preferences. To deal with this, Harsanyi distinguishes between "manifest" preferences and "true" preferences. The former are those "manifested by his observed behaviour, including preferences possibly based on erroneous factual beliefs, or on careless logical analysis, or on strong emotions that at the moment greatly hinder rational choice"; whereas the latter are "the preferences he would have if he had all the relevant factual information, always reasoned with the greatest possible care, and were in a state of mind most conducive to rational choice." It is the latter that preference utilitarianism tries to satisfy.

The second caveat is that antisocial preferences, such as sadism, envy, and resentment, have to be excluded. Harsanyi achieves this by claiming that such preferences partially exclude those people from the moral community:

Utilitarian ethics makes all of us members of the same moral community. A person displaying ill will toward others does remain a member of this community, but not with his whole personality. That part of his personality that harbours these hostile antisocial feelings must be excluded from membership, and has no claim for a hearing when it comes to defining our concept of social utility.

=== Negative utilitarianism ===
In The Open Society and its Enemies (1945), Karl Popper argues that the principle "maximize pleasure" should be replaced by "minimize pain". He believes that "it is not only impossible but very dangerous to attempt to maximize the pleasure or the happiness of the people, since such an attempt must lead to totalitarianism." He claims that:

[T]here is, from the ethical point of view, no symmetry between suffering and happiness, or between pain and pleasure... In my opinion human suffering makes a direct moral appeal, namely, the appeal for help, while there is no similar call to increase the happiness of a man who is doing well anyway. A further criticism of the Utilitarian formula "Maximize pleasure" is that it assumes a continuous pleasure-pain scale that lets us treat degrees of pain as negative degrees of pleasure. But, from the moral point of view, pain cannot be outweighed by pleasure, and especially not one man's pain by another man's pleasure. Instead of the greatest happiness for the greatest number, one should demand, more modestly, the least amount of avoidable suffering for all...

The actual term negative utilitarianism itself was introduced by R. N. Smart as the title to his 1958 reply to Popper in which he argues that the principle would entail seeking the quickest and least painful method of killing the entirety of humanity.

In response to Smart's argument, Simon Knutsson (2019) has argued that classical utilitarianism and similar consequentialist views are roughly equally likely to entail killing the entirety of humanity, as they would seem to imply that one should kill existing beings and replace them with happier beings if possible. Consequently, Knutsson argues:

The world destruction argument is not a reason to reject negative utilitarianism in favour of these other forms of consequentialism, because there are similar arguments against such theories that are at least as persuasive as the world destruction argument is against negative utilitarianism.

Furthermore, Knutsson notes that one could argue that other forms of consequentialism, such as classical utilitarianism, in some cases have less plausible implications than negative utilitarianism, such as in scenarios where classical utilitarianism implies it would be right to kill everyone and replace them in a manner that creates more suffering, but also more well-being such that the sum, on the classical utilitarian calculus, is net positive. Negative utilitarianism, in contrast, would not allow such killing.

Some versions of negative utilitarianism include:

- Negative total utilitarianism: tolerates suffering that can be compensated within the same person.
- Negative preference utilitarianism: avoids the problem of moral killing with reference to existing preferences that such killing would violate, while it still demands a justification for the creation of new lives. A possible justification is the reduction of the average level of preference-frustration.
- Pessimistic representatives of negative utilitarianism, which can be found in the environment of Buddhism.

Some see negative utilitarianism as a branch within modern hedonistic utilitarianism, which assigns a higher weight to the avoidance of suffering than to the promotion of happiness. The moral weight of suffering can be increased by using a "compassionate" utilitarian metric, so that the result is the same as in prioritarianism.

=== Motive utilitarianism ===
Motive utilitarianism was first proposed by Robert Merrihew Adams in 1976. Whereas act utilitarianism requires us to choose our actions by estimating which action will maximize utility and rule utilitarianism requires us to implement rules that will, on the whole, maximize utility, motive utilitarianism "has the utility calculus being used to select motives and dispositions according to their general felicific effects, and those motives and dispositions then dictate our choices of actions."

The arguments for moving to some form of motive utilitarianism at the personal level can be seen as mirroring the arguments for moving to some form of rule utilitarianism at the social level. Adams (1976) refers to Sidgwick's observation that "Happiness (general as well as individual) is likely to be better attained if the extent to which we set ourselves consciously to aim at it be carefully restricted." Trying to apply the utility calculation on each and every occasion is likely to lead to a sub-optimal outcome. It is argued that applying carefully selected rules at the social level and encouraging appropriate motives at the personal level are likely to lead to better overall outcomes; even though on some individual occasions it leads to the wrong action when assessed according to act utilitarian standards.

Adams concludes that "right action, by act-utilitarian standards, and right motivation, by motive-utilitarian standards, are incompatible in some cases." The necessity of this conclusion is rejected by Fred Feldman who argues that "the conflict in question results from an inadequate formulation of the utilitarian doctrines; motives play no essential role in it ... [and that] ... [p]recisely the same sort of conflict arises even when MU is left out of consideration and AU is applied by itself." Instead, Feldman proposes a variant of act utilitarianism that results in there being no conflict between it and motive utilitarianism.

=== Wealth maximization ===
Another 20th-century offshoot of utilitarian-style thinking, often labeled wealth maximization, has its economic roots in the "potential Pareto improvements" advanced by Nicholas Kaldor, John Hicks, and Tibor Scitovsky. While traditional Pareto criteria require that no one be made worse off, wealth maximization—closely tied to the Kaldor–Hicks efficiency—permits changes that increase overall economic surplus even if some parties lose, so long as the winners could in principle compensate the losers.

In legal scholarship, the concept was popularized by Richard Posner in Economic Analysis of Law (1973). Under this approach, a policy or rule is deemed socially desirable if it produces a net increase in aggregate "wealth", typically measured by willingness-to-pay for outcomes. Advocates argue that, because willingness-to-pay translates diverse preferences into comparable monetary values, wealth maximization can reconcile the problem of interpersonally adding "utilities". Critics counter that wealthier parties can effectively "outbid" poorer ones and thus skew outcomes. Supporters respond that distributional worries can be handled by taxes and transfers, leaving wealth maximization to guide efficient resource allocation in law.

== Criticisms and responses ==
Because utilitarianism is not a single theory, but rather a cluster of related theories that have been developed over two hundred years, criticisms can be made for different reasons and have different targets.

=== Aggregating utility ===
The objection that "utilitarianism does not take seriously the distinction between persons" came to prominence in 1971 with the publication of John Rawls' A Theory of Justice. The concept is also important in animal rights advocate Richard Ryder's rejection of utilitarianism, in which he talks of the "boundary of the individual", through which neither pain nor pleasure may pass.

However, a similar objection was noted in 1970 by Thomas Nagel, who claimed that consequentialism "treats the desires, needs, satisfactions, and dissatisfactions of distinct persons as if they were the desires, etc., of a mass person;" and even earlier by David Gauthier, who wrote that utilitarianism supposes that "mankind is a super-person, whose greatest satisfaction is the objective of moral action. ... But this is absurd. Individuals have wants, not mankind; individuals seek satisfaction, not mankind. A person's satisfaction is not part of any greater satisfaction." Thus, the aggregation of utility becomes futile as both pain and happiness are intrinsic to and inseparable from the consciousness in which they are felt, rendering impossible the task of adding up the various pleasures of multiple individuals.

A response to this criticism is to point out that whilst seeming to resolve some problems it introduces others. Intuitively, there are many cases where people do want to take the numbers involved into account. As Alastair Norcross has said:

[S]uppose that Homer is faced with the painful choice between saving Barney from a burning building or saving both Moe and Apu from the building ... it is clearly better for Homer to save the larger number, precisely because it is a larger number. ... Can anyone who really considers the matter seriously honestly claim to believe that it is worse that one person die than that the entire sentient population of the universe be severely mutilated? Clearly not.

It may be possible to uphold the distinction between persons whilst still aggregating utility, if it accepted that people can be influenced by empathy. This position is advocated by Iain King, who has suggested the evolutionary basis of empathy means humans can take into account the interests of other individuals, but only on a one-to-one basis, "since we can only imagine ourselves in the mind of one other person at a time." King uses this insight to adapt utilitarianism, and it may help reconcile Bentham's philosophy with deontology and virtue ethics.

Philosopher John Taurek also argued that the idea of adding happiness or pleasures across persons is quite unintelligible and that the numbers of persons involved in a situation are morally irrelevant. Taurek's basic concern comes down to this: people cannot explain what it means to say that things would be five times worse if five people die than if one person dies. "I cannot give a satisfactory account of the meaning of judgments of this kind", he wrote (p. 304). He argues that each person can only lose one person's happiness or pleasures. There is not five times more loss of happiness or pleasure when five die: who would be feeling this happiness or pleasure? "Each person's potential loss has the same significance to me, only as a loss to that person alone. because, by hypothesis, I have an equal concern for each person involved, I am moved to give each of them an equal chance to be spared his loss" (p. 307). Derek Parfit (1978) and others have criticized Taurek's line, and it continues to be discussed.

=== Calculation time ===
An early criticism, which was addressed by Mill, is that if time is taken to calculate the best course of action it is likely that the opportunity to take the best course of action will already have passed. Mill responded that there had been ample time to estimate the likely effects:

[N]amely, the whole past duration of the human species. During all that time, mankind have been learning by experience the tendencies of actions; on which experience all the prudence, as well as all the morality of life, are dependent...It is a strange notion that the acknowledgment of a first principle is inconsistent with the admission of secondary ones. To inform a traveller respecting the place of his ultimate destination, is not to forbid the use of landmarks and direction-posts on the way. The proposition that happiness is the end and aim of morality, does not mean that no road ought to be laid down to that goal, or that persons going thither should not be advised to take one direction rather than another. Men really ought to leave off talking a kind of nonsense on this subject, which they would neither talk nor listen to on other matters of practical concernment.

More recently, Hardin has made the same point. "It should embarrass philosophers that they have ever taken this objection seriously. Parallel considerations in other realms are dismissed with eminently good sense. Lord Devlin notes, 'if the reasonable man "worked to rule" by perusing to the point of comprehension every form he was handed, the commercial and administrative life of the country would creep to a standstill.'"

It is such considerations that lead even act utilitarians to rely on "rules of thumb", as Smart (1973) has called them.

=== Criticisms of utilitarian value theory ===
Utilitarianism's assertion that well-being is the only thing with intrinsic moral value has been attacked by various critics. Thomas Carlyle derided "Benthamee Utility, virtue by Profit and Loss; reducing this God's-world to a dead brute Steam-engine, the infinite celestial Soul of Man to a kind of Hay-balance for weighing hay and thistles on, pleasures and pains on". Karl Marx, in Das Kapital, criticises Bentham's utilitarianism on the grounds that it does not appear to recognise that people have different joys in different socioeconomic contexts:

With the driest naivete he takes the modern shopkeeper, especially the English shopkeeper, as the normal man. Whatever is useful to this queer normal man, and to his world, is absolutely useful. This yard-measure, then, he applies to past, present, and future. The Christian religion, e.g., is "useful," "because it forbids in the name of religion the same faults that the penal code condemns in the name of the law." Artistic criticism is "harmful," because it disturbs worthy people in their enjoyment of Martin Tupper, etc. With such rubbish has the brave fellow, with his motto, "nulla dies sine linea [no day without a line]", piled up mountains of books.

Pope John Paul II, following his personalist philosophy, argued that a danger of utilitarianism is that it tends to make persons, just as much as things, the object of use. "Utilitarianism", he wrote, "is a civilization of production and of use, a civilization of things and not of persons, a civilization in which persons are used in the same way as things are used."

=== Demandingness objection ===
Act utilitarianism not only requires everyone to do what they can to maximize utility, but to do so without any favouritism. Mill said, "As between his own happiness and that of others, utilitarianism requires him to be as strictly impartial as a disinterested and benevolent spectator." Critics say that this combination of requirements leads to utilitarianism making unreasonable demands. The well-being of strangers counts just as much as that of friends, family or self. "What makes this requirement so demanding is the gargantuan number of strangers in great need of help and the indefinitely many opportunities to make sacrifices to help them." As Shelly Kagan says, "Given the parameters of the actual world, there is no question that ... (maximally) ... promoting the good would require a life of hardship, self-denial, and austerity ... a life spent promoting the good would be a severe one indeed."

Hooker (2002) describes two aspects to the problem: act utilitarianism requires huge sacrifices from those who are relatively better off and also requires sacrifice of your own good even when the aggregate good will be only slightly increased. Another way of highlighting the complaint is to say that in utilitarianism, "there is no such thing as morally permissible self-sacrifice that goes above and beyond the call of duty." Mill was quite clear about this, "A sacrifice which does not increase, or tend to increase, the sum total of happiness, it considers as wasted."

One response to the problem is to accept its demands. This is the view taken by Peter Singer, who says:

No doubt we do instinctively prefer to help those who are close to us. Few could stand by and watch a child drown; many can ignore the avoidable deaths of children in Africa or India. The question, however, is not what we usually do, but what we ought to do, and it is difficult to see any sound moral justification for the view that distance, or community membership, makes a crucial difference to our obligations.

Others argue that a moral theory that is so contrary to our deeply held moral convictions must either be rejected or modified. There have been various attempts to modify utilitarianism to escape its seemingly over-demanding requirements. One approach is to drop the demand that utility be maximized. In Satisficing Consequentialism, Michael Slote argues for a form of utilitarianism where "an act might qualify as morally right through having good enough consequences, even though better consequences could have been produced." One advantage of such a system is that it would be able to accommodate the notion of supererogatory actions.

Samuel Scheffler takes a different approach and amends the requirement that everyone be treated the same. In particular, Scheffler suggests that there is an "agent-centered prerogative" such that when the overall utility is being calculated, it is permitted to count our own interests more heavily than the interests of others. Kagan suggests that such a procedure might be justified on the grounds that "a general requirement to promote the good would lack the motivational underpinning necessary for genuine moral requirements" and, secondly, that personal independence is necessary for the existence of commitments and close personal relations and that "the value of such commitments yields a positive reason for preserving within moral theory at least some moral independence for the personal point of view."

Robert Goodin takes yet another approach and argues that the demandingness objection can be "blunted" by treating utilitarianism as a guide to public policy rather than one of individual morality. He suggests that many of the problems arise under the traditional formulation because the conscientious utilitarian ends up having to make up for the failings of others and so contributing more than their fair share.

Gandjour specifically considers market situations and analyses whether individuals who act in markets may produce a utilitarian optimum. He lists several demanding conditions that need to be satisfied: individuals need to display instrumental rationality, markets need to be perfectly competitive, and income and goods need to be redistributed.

Harsanyi argues that the objection overlooks the fact that "people attach considerable utility to freedom from unduly burdensome moral obligations ... most people will prefer a society with a more relaxed moral code, and will feel that such a society will achieve a higher level of average utility—even if adoption of such a moral code should lead to some losses in economic and cultural accomplishments (so long as these losses remain within tolerable limits). This means that utilitarianism, if correctly interpreted, will yield a moral code with a standard of acceptable conduct very much below the level of highest moral perfection, leaving plenty of scope for supererogatory actions exceeding this minimum standard."

=== Duty-based criticisms ===
W. D. Ross, speaking from the perspective of his deontological pluralism, acknowledges that there is a duty to promote the maximum of aggregate good, as utilitarianism demands. But, Ross contends, this is just one besides various other duties, like the duty to keep one's promises or to make amends for wrongful acts, which are ignored by the simplistic and reductive utilitarian outlook.

Roger Scruton was a deontologist, and believed that utilitarianism did not give duty the place that it needed inside our ethical judgements. He asked us to consider the dilemma of Anna Karenina, who had to choose between her love of Vronsky and her duty towards her husband and her son. Scruton wrote, "Suppose Anna were to reason that it is better to satisfy two healthy young people and frustrate one old one than to satisfy one old person and frustrate two young ones, by a factor of 2.5 to 1: ergo I am leaving. What would we think, then, of her moral seriousness?"

=== Quantifying utility ===
A common objection to utilitarianism is the inability to quantify, compare, or measure happiness or well-being. Rachael Briggs writes in the Stanford Encyclopedia of Philosophy:

One objection to this interpretation of utility is that there may not be a single good (or indeed any good) which rationality requires us to seek. But if we understand "utility" broadly enough to include all potentially desirable ends—pleasure, knowledge, friendship, health and so on—it's not clear that there is a unique correct way to make the tradeoffs between different goods so that each outcome receives a utility. There may be no good answer to the question of whether the life of an ascetic monk contains more or less good than the life of a happy libertine—but assigning utilities to these options forces us to compare them.

Utility understood this way is a personal preference, in the absence of any objective measurement.

=== Special obligations criticism ===
One of the oldest criticisms of utilitarianism is that it ignores special obligations. Classical utilitarianism does not attribute special weights to relatives. The first to address this was an early utilitarian and friend of Jeremy Bentham named William Godwin, who held in his work Enquiry Concerning Political Justice that such personal needs should be disregarded in favour of the greatest good for the greatest number of people. Applying the utilitarian principle "that life ought to be preferred which will be most conducive to the general good" to the choice of saving one of two people, either "the illustrious Archbishop of Cambray" or his chambermaid, he wrote:

Supposing the chambermaid had been my wife, my mother or my benefactor. That would not alter the truth of the proposition. The life of [the Archbishop] would still be more valuable than that of the chambermaid; and justice, pure, unadulterated justice, would still have preferred that which was most valuable.

=== Utility ignores justice ===
As Rosen (2003) has pointed out, claiming that act utilitarians are not concerned about having rules is to set up a "straw man". Similarly, R.M. Hare refers to "the crude caricature of act utilitarianism which is the only version of it that many philosophers seem to be acquainted with." According to Bentham, utilitarians should account for indirect harm to society ("second order evils").

==== "Sheriff scenario" ====
A classic version of this criticism was given by H. J. McCloskey in his 1957 "sheriff scenario":

Suppose that a sheriff were faced with the choice either of framing a Negro for a rape that had aroused hostility to the Negroes (a particular Negro generally being believed to be guilty but whom the sheriff knows not to be guilty)—and thus preventing serious anti-Negro riots which would probably lead to some loss of life and increased hatred of each other by whites and Negroes—or of hunting for the guilty person and thereby allowing the anti-Negro riots to occur, while doing the best he can to combat them. In such a case the sheriff, if he were an extreme utilitarian, would appear to be committed to framing the Negro.

By "extreme" utilitarian, McCloskey is referring to what later came to be called act utilitarianism. He suggests one response might be that the sheriff would not frame the innocent negro because of another rule: "do not punish an innocent person". Another response might be that the riots the sheriff is trying to avoid might have positive utility in the long run by drawing attention to questions of race and resources to help address tensions between the communities. In a later article, McCloskey says:

Surely the utilitarian must admit that whatever the facts of the matter may be, it is logically possible that an 'unjust' system of punishment—e.g. a system involving collective punishments, retroactive laws and punishments, or punishments of parents and relations of the offender—may be more useful than a 'just' system of punishment?

==== The Brothers Karamazov ====
An older form of this argument was presented by Fyodor Dostoyevsky in his book The Brothers Karamazov, in which Ivan challenges his brother Alyosha to answer his question:

Tell me straight out, I call on you—answer me: imagine that you yourself are building the edifice of human destiny with the object of making people happy in the finale, of giving them peace and rest at last, but for that you must inevitably and unavoidably torture just one tiny creature, [one child], and raise your edifice on the foundation of her unrequited tears—would you agree to be the architect on such conditions? ... And can you admit the idea that the people for whom you are building would agree to accept their happiness on the unjustified blood of a tortured child, and having accepted it, to remain forever happy?

This scenario was illustrated in more depth in 1973 by Ursula K. Le Guin in the celebrated short story The Ones Who Walk Away from Omelas.

=== Predicting consequences ===
Some argue that it is impossible to do the calculation that utilitarianism requires because consequences are inherently unknowable. Daniel Dennett describes this as the "Three Mile Island effect". Dennett points out that not only is it impossible to assign a precise utility value to the incident, it is impossible to know whether, ultimately, the near-meltdown that occurred was a good or bad thing. He suggests that it would have been a good thing if plant operators learned lessons that prevented future serious incidents.

Russell Hardin (1990) rejects such arguments. He argues that it is possible to distinguish the moral impulse of utilitarianism (which is "to define the right as good consequences and to motivate people to achieve these") from our ability to correctly apply rational principles that, among other things, "depend on the perceived facts of the case and on the particular moral actor's mental equipment." The fact that the latter is limited and can change does not mean that the former has to be rejected. "If we develop a better system for determining relevant causal relations so that we are able to choose actions that better produce our intended ends, it does not follow that we then must change our ethics. The moral impulse of utilitarianism is constant, but our decisions under it are contingent on our knowledge and scientific understanding."

From the beginning, utilitarianism has recognized that certainty in such matters is unobtainable and both Bentham and Mill said that it was necessary to rely on the tendencies of actions to bring about consequences. G. E. Moore, writing in 1903, said:

We certainly cannot hope directly to compare their effects except within a limited future; and all the arguments, which have ever been used in Ethics, and upon which we commonly act in common life, directed to shewing that one course is superior to another, are (apart from theological dogmas) confined to pointing out such probable immediate advantages ... An ethical law has the nature not of a scientific law but of a scientific prediction: and the latter is always merely probable, although the probability may be very great.

=== The happiness pump thought experiment ===
A thought experiment known as the happiness pump has been offered as a critique of act utilitarianism by the American philosopher Joshua David Greene. The term describes a person who takes the principle of impartiality to its logical extreme, viewing their own well-being as holding no more moral weight than that of a complete stranger. Because global suffering and need are vast, such an individual is morally obligated to continuously divest themselves of wealth, comfort, and leisure time. They reduce their own life to the absolute minimum required to survive, pumping all available resources into the rest of the world to maximize aggregate global utility. In his book Moral Tribes, Greene states:

The utilitarian bleeding will continue until you've given away all of your disposable income where "disposable" refers to all of the income that you don't need to maximize your ability to donate to people who are worse off than you. Utilitarianism apparently requires you to turn yourself into a happiness pump. To most people, this does not sound so splendid.

== Additional considerations ==
=== Average versus total happiness ===
In The Methods of Ethics, Henry Sidgwick asked, "Is it total or average happiness that we seek to make a maximum?" Paley notes that, although he speaks of the happiness of communities, "the happiness of a people is made up of the happiness of single persons; and the quantity of happiness can only be augmented by increasing the number of the percipients, or the pleasure of their perceptions" and that if extreme cases, such as people held as slaves, are excluded the amount of happiness will usually be in proportion to the number of people. Consequently, "the decay of population is the greatest evil that a state can suffer; and the improvement of it the object which ought, in all countries, to be aimed at in preference to every other political purpose whatsoever." A similar view was expressed by Smart, who argued that, all other things being equal, a universe with two million happy people is better than a universe with only one million happy people.

According to Derek Parfit, using total happiness results in the mere addition paradox: large numbers of people with very low but non-negative utility values can be seen as a better goal than a population of a less extreme size living in comfort. In other words, according to the theory, it is a moral good to breed more people on the world for as long as total happiness rises. William Shaw suggests that the problem raised by Parfit can be avoided if a distinction is made between potential people, who need not concern us, and actual future people, who should concern us. He says, "utilitarianism values the happiness of people, not the production of units of happiness. Accordingly, one has no positive obligation to have children. However, if you have decided to have a child, then you have an obligation to give birth to the happiest child you can."

On the other hand, measuring the utility of a population based on the average utility of that population avoids Parfit's repugnant conclusion but causes other problems. For example, bringing a moderately happy person into a very happy world would be seen as an immoral act; aside from this, the theory implies that it would be a moral good to eliminate all people whose happiness is below average, as this would raise the average happiness. Additionally, the calculations made based on average utility implausibly judge a crowded hell to be better than less crowded one. According to the principle of average utility, a group of people being brutally tortured would be made better off by the addition of more people who are tortured slightly less.

=== Motives, intentions, and actions ===
Utilitarianism is typically taken to assess the rightness or wrongness of an action by considering just the consequences of that action. Bentham very carefully distinguishes motive from intention and says that motives are not in themselves good or bad but can be referred to as such on account of their tendency to produce pleasure or pain. He adds that, "from every kind of motive, may proceed actions that are good, others that are bad, and others that are indifferent." Mill makes a similar point and explicitly says that "motive has nothing to do with the morality of the action, though much with the worth of the agent. He who saves a fellow creature from drowning does what is morally right, whether his motive be duty, or the hope of being paid for his trouble."

However, with intention the situation is more complex. In a footnote printed in the second edition of Utilitarianism, Mill says: "the morality of the action depends entirely upon the intention—that is, upon what the agent wills to do." Elsewhere, he says, "Intention, and motive, are two very different things. But it is the intention, that is, the foresight of consequences, which constitutes the moral rightness or wrongness of the act."

The correct interpretation of Mill's footnote is a matter of some debate. The difficulty in interpretation centres around trying to explain why, since it is consequences that matter, intentions should play a role in the assessment of the morality of an action but motives should not. One possibility "involves supposing that the 'morality' of the act is one thing, probably to do with the praiseworthiness or blameworthiness of the agent, and its rightness or wrongness another." Jonathan Dancy rejects this interpretation on the grounds that Mill is explicitly making intention relevant to an assessment of the act not to an assessment of the agent.

An interpretation given by Roger Crisp draws on a definition given by Mill in A System of Logic, where he says that an "intention to produce the effect, is one thing; the effect produced in consequence of the intention, is another thing; the two together constitute the action." Accordingly, whilst two actions may outwardly appear to be the same they will be different actions if there is a different intention. Dancy notes that this does not explain why intentions count but motives do not.

A third interpretation is that an action might be considered a complex action consisting of several stages and it is the intention that determines which of these stages are to be considered part of the action. Although this is the interpretation favoured by Dancy, he recognizes that this might not have been Mill's own view, for Mill "would not even allow that 'p & q' expresses a complex proposition. He wrote in his System of Logic I iv. 3, of 'Caesar is dead and Brutus is alive', that 'we might as well call a street a complex house, as these two propositions a complex proposition'."

Finally, whilst motives may not play a role in determining the morality of an action, this does not preclude utilitarians from fostering particular motives if doing so will increase overall happiness.

=== Other sentient beings ===
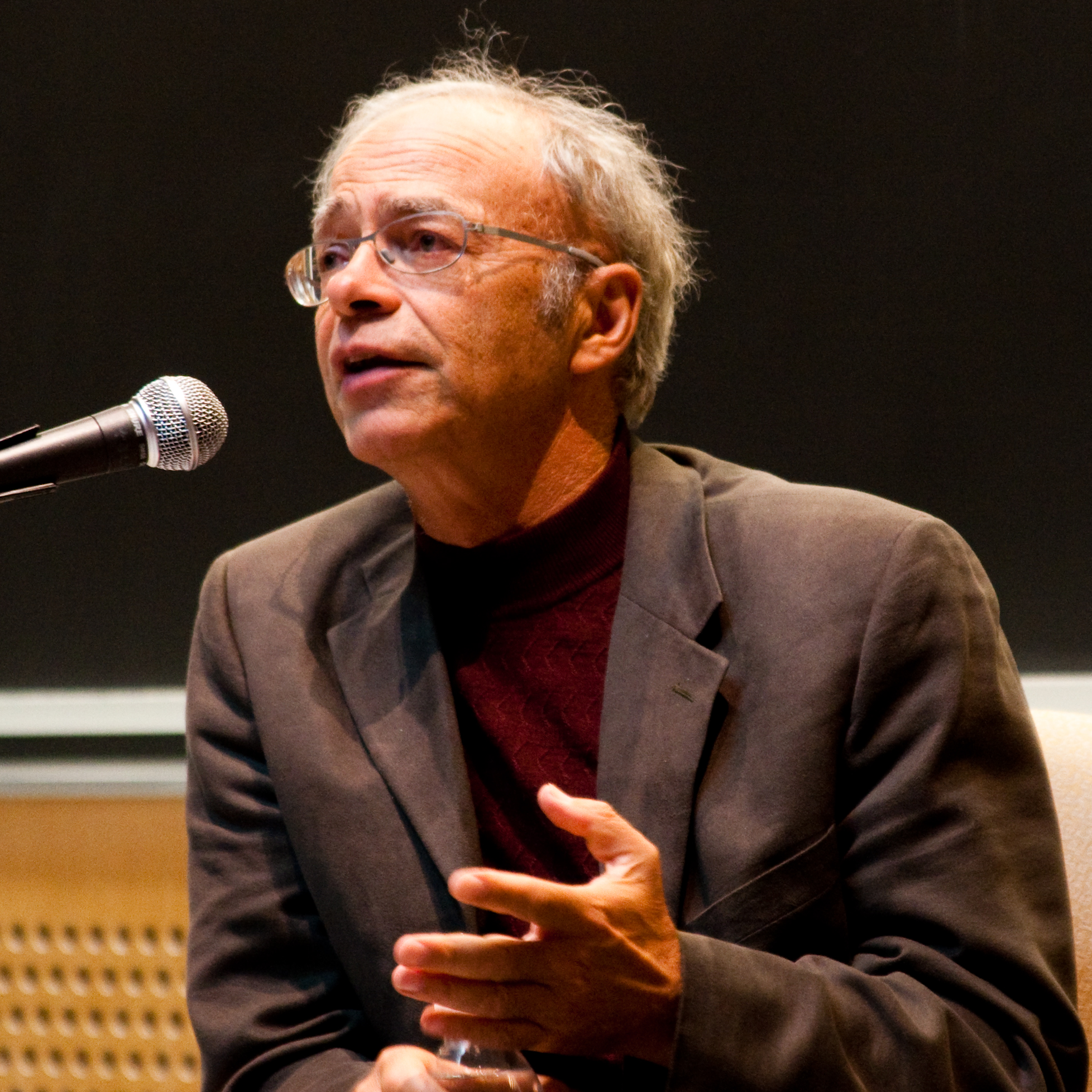
Peter Singer

In An Introduction to the Principles of Morals and Legislation, Bentham wrote "the question is not, Can they reason? nor, Can they talk? but, Can they suffer?" Mill's distinction between higher and lower pleasures might suggest that he gave more status to humans. However, in his essay "Whewell on Moral Philosophy", Mill defends Bentham's position, calling it a "noble anticipation", and writing: "Granted that any practice causes more pain to animals than it gives pleasure to man; is that practice moral or immoral? And if, exactly in proportion as human beings raise their heads out of the slough of selfishness, they do not with one voice answer 'immoral', let the morality of the principle of utility be for ever condemned."

Henry Sidgwick also considers the implications of utilitarianism for nonhuman animals. He writes:

"We have next to consider who the 'all' are, whose happiness is to be taken into account. Are we to extend our concern to all the beings capable of pleasure and pain whose feelings are affected by our conduct? or are we to confine our view to human happiness? The former view is the one adopted by Bentham and Mill, and (I believe) by the Utilitarian school generally: and is obviously most in accordance with the universality that is characteristic of their principle ... it seems arbitrary and unreasonable to exclude from the end, as so conceived, any pleasure of any sentient being."

Among contemporary utilitarian philosophers, Peter Singer is especially known for arguing that the well-being of all sentient beings ought to be given equal consideration. Singer suggests that rights are conferred according to the level of a creature's sentience, regardless of their species. He adds that humans tend to be speciesist (discriminatory against non-humans) in ethical matters, and argues that, in utilitarianism, speciesism cannot be justified as there is no rational distinction that can be made between the suffering of humans and the suffering of nonhuman animals; all suffering ought to be reduced. Singer writes: "The racist violates the principle of equality by giving greater weight to the interests of members of his own race, when there is a clash between their interests and the interests of those of another race. Similarly the speciesist allows the interests of his own species to override the greater interests of members of other species. The pattern is the same in each case ... Most human beings are speciesists."

In John Stuart Mill's essay "On Nature" he argues that the welfare of wild animals is to be considered when making utilitarian judgments. Tyler Cowen argues that, if individual animals are carriers of utility, then the predatory activity of carnivores should be limited relative to their victims: "At the very least, we should limit current subsidies to nature's carnivores."

This view still might be contrasted with deep ecology, which holds that an intrinsic value is attached to all forms of life and nature, whether currently assumed to be sentient or not. According to utilitarianism, the forms of life that are unable to experience anything akin to either enjoyment or discomfort are denied moral status, because it is impossible to increase the happiness or reduce the suffering of something that cannot feel happiness or suffer. Singer writes:

The capacity for suffering and enjoying things is a prerequisite for having interests at all, a condition that must be satisfied before we can speak of interests in any meaningful way. It would be nonsense to say that it was not in the interests of a stone to be kicked along the road by a schoolboy. A stone does not have interests because it cannot suffer. Nothing that we can do to it could possibly make any difference to its welfare. A mouse, on the other hand, does have an interest in not being tormented, because it will suffer if it is. If a being suffers, there can be no moral justification for refusing to take that suffering into consideration. No matter what the nature of the being, the principle of equality requires that its suffering be counted equally with the like suffering—in so far as rough comparisons can be made—of any other being. If a being is not capable of suffering, or of experiencing enjoyment or happiness, there is nothing to be taken into account.

Thus, the moral value of one-celled organisms, as well as some multi-cellular organisms, and natural entities like a river, is only in the benefit they provide to sentient beings. Similarly, utilitarianism places no direct intrinsic value on biodiversity, although the benefits that biodiversity brings to sentient beings may mean that, in utilitarianism, biodiversity ought to be maintained in general.

==== Digital minds ====
Nick Bostrom and Carl Shulman consider that, as advancements in artificial intelligence continue, it will probably be possible to engineer digital minds that require less resources and have a much higher rate and intensity of subjective experience than humans. These "super-beneficiaries" could also be unaffected by hedonic adaptation. Nick Bostrom said that people should find "paths that will enable digital minds and biological minds to coexist, in a mutually beneficial way where all of these different forms can flourish and thrive".

== Application to specific problems ==
The concept has been applied towards social welfare economics, questions of justice, the crisis of global poverty, the ethics of raising animals for food, and the importance of avoiding existential risks to humanity. In the context of lying, some utilitarians support white lies.

=== World poverty ===
An article in the American Economic Journal has addressed the issue of Utilitarian ethics within redistribution of wealth. The journal stated that taxation of the wealthy is the best way to make use of the disposable income they receive. This says that the money creates utility for the most people by funding government services. Many utilitarian philosophers, including Peter Singer and Toby Ord, argue that inhabitants of developed countries in particular have an obligation to help to end extreme poverty across the world, for example by regularly donating some of their income to charity. Peter Singer, for example, argues that donating some of one's income to charity could help save a life or cure somebody from a poverty-related illness, which is a much better use of the money as it brings someone in extreme poverty far more happiness than it would bring to oneself if one lived in relative comfort. However, Singer not only argues that one ought to donate a significant proportion of one's income to charity, but also that this money should be directed to the most cost-effective charities, in order to bring about the greatest good for the greatest number, consistent with utilitarian thinking. Singer's ideas have formed the basis of the modern effective altruism movement.

=== Social choice ===
In social choice and operations research, the utilitarian rule (also called the max-sum rule) is a rule saying that, among all possible alternatives, society should pick the alternative which maximizes the sum of the utilities of all individuals in society. It is a formal mathematical representation of the utilitarian philosophy, and is often justified by reference to Harsanyi's utilitarian theorem or the Von Neumann–Morgenstern theorem.

==== Criminal justice ====
According to the utilitarian, justice is the maximization of the total or average welfare across all relevant individuals. Utilitarianism fights crime in three ways:

1. Deterrence. The credible threat of punishment might lead people to make different choices; well-designed threats might lead people to make choices that maximize welfare. This matches some strong intuitions about just punishment: that it should generally be proportional to the crime. Successful deterrence would reduce crime statistics.
2. Rehabilitation. Punishment might make "bad people" into "better" ones. For the utilitarian, all that "bad person" can mean is "person who's likely to cause unwanted things (like suffering)". So, utilitarianism could recommend punishment that changes someone such that they are less likely to cause bad things. Successful rehabilitation would reduce recidivism.
3. Security/Incapacitation. Perhaps there are people who are irredeemable causers of bad things. If so, imprisoning them might maximize welfare by limiting their opportunities to cause harm and therefore the benefit lies within protecting society.

So, the reason for punishment is the maximization of welfare, and punishment should be of whomever, and of whatever form and severity, are needed to meet that goal. This may sometimes justify punishing the innocent, or inflicting disproportionately severe punishments, when that will have the best consequences overall (perhaps executing a few suspected shoplifters live on television would be an effective deterrent to shoplifting, for instance). It also suggests that punishment might turn out never to be right, depending on the facts about what actual consequences it has.

== See also ==
- Appeal to consequences
- Applied ethics
- Bounded rationality
- Charity International
- Classical liberalism
- Collectivism and individualism
- Common good
- Cost–benefit analysis
- Decision analysis
- Gross national happiness
- Happiness pump
- List of utilitarians
- Moral luck
- Pleasure principle (psychology)
- Probabilistic reasoning
- Radicalism (historical)
- Relative utilitarianism
- Uncertainty
- Utilitarian bioethics
- Utilitarian cake-cutting
- Utility monster
