= Richard Brandt =

American philosopher (1910–1997)

- Born: Richard Booker Brandt; 17 October 1910; Wilmington, Ohio, U.S.
- Died: 10 September 1997 (aged 86); Ann Arbor, Michigan, U.S.

Education
- Education: Denison University; Cambridge University; Yale University
- Academic advisor: F. R. Tennant

Philosophical work
- Era: Contemporary philosophy
- Region: Western philosophy
- School: Analytic
- Institutions: University of Michigan
- Doctoral students: Anita L. Allen
- Main interests: Moral philosophy
- Notable ideas: Rule utilitarianism, cognitive psychotherapy, ideal observer theory, ethical subjectivism

Richard Booker Brandt (17 October 1910 – 10 September 1997) was an American philosopher working in the utilitarian tradition in moral philosophy.

== Education and career ==
Brandt was originally educated at Denison University, a Baptist institution he was shepherded to by his minister father, and graduated in 1930 with majors in philosophy and classical studies. In 1933 he earned another B.A., this time in the philosophy of religion, from Cambridge University. He received his Ph.D. in philosophy from Yale University in 1936. He taught at Swarthmore College before becoming Chair of the Department of Philosophy the University of Michigan in 1964, where he taught with Charles Stevenson and William K. Frankena and spent the remainder of his career. The expressivist moral philosopher Allan Gibbard has mentioned his great intellectual debt to Brandt.

Brandt gave the John Locke Lectures at Oxford University in 1974–75, material that later appeared in A Theory of the Good and the Right (1979).

== Philosophical work ==
Brandt wrote Ethical Theory (1959), an influential textbook in the field. He defended a version of rule utilitarianism in "Toward a credible form of utilitarianism" (1963) and performed cultural-anthropological studies in Hopi Ethics (1954). In A Theory of the Good and the Right, Brandt proposed a "reforming definition" of rationality, that one is rational if one's preferences are such that they survive cognitive psychotherapy in terms of all relevant information and logical criticism. He argued also that the morality such rational persons would accept would be a form of utilitarianism.

Brandt believed that moral rules should be considered in sets which he called moral codes. A moral code is justified when it is the optimal code that, if adopted and followed, would maximise the public good more than any alternative code would. The codes may be society-wide standards or special codes for a profession like engineering.

== See also ==
- American philosophy
