= Rule utilitarianism =

Ethical principle; incorporates deontology into greatest-happiness thinking

Rule utilitarianism is a form of utilitarianism that says an action is right as it conforms to a rule that leads to the greatest good, or that "the rightness or wrongness of a particular action is a function of the correctness of the rule of which it is an instance". Philosophers Richard Brandt and Brad Hooker are major proponents of such an approach.

For rule utilitarians, the correctness of a rule is determined by the amount of good it brings about when followed. In contrast, act utilitarians judge an act in terms of the consequences of that act alone (such as stopping at a red light), rather than judging whether it faithfully adhered to the rule of which it was an instance (such as, "always stop at red lights"). Rule utilitarians argue that following rules that tend to lead to the greatest good will have better consequences overall than allowing exceptions to be made in individual instances, even if better consequences can be demonstrated in those instances.

== Mill's formulation ==
In his 1863 book Utilitarianism, John Stuart Mill defends the concept of rights in terms of utility: "To have a right, then, is, I conceive, to have something which society ought to defend me in the possession of. If the objector goes on to ask, why it ought? I can give him no other reason than general utility." Whether Mill was a rule utilitarian is a matter of controversy. This passage from Utilitarianism seems to suggest that he was:

In the case of abstinences indeed—of things which people forbear to do from moral considerations, though the consequences in the particular case might be beneficial—it would be unworthy of an intelligent agent not to be consciously aware that the action is of a class which, if practiced generally, would be generally injurious, and that this is the ground of the obligation to abstain from it.

But Mill also argues that it is sometimes right to violate general ethical rules:

... justice is a name for certain moral requirements, which, regarded collectively, stand higher in the scale of social utility, and are therefore of more paramount obligation, than any others; though particular cases may occur in which some other social duty is so important, as to overrule any one of the general maxims of justice. Thus, to save a life, it may not only be allowable, but a duty, to steal, or take by force, the necessary food or medicine, or to kidnap, and compel to officiate, the only qualified medical practitioner.

Utilitarians can justify a system that goes, "Keep to the rules unless there is a strong reason for breaking them." in this utilitarian framework.

== Strong rule utilitarianism ==
Strong rule utilitarianism (SRU) gives a utilitarian account for the claim that moral rules should be obeyed at all places and times. SRU does not deteriorate into act utilitarianism like weak rule utilitarianism, but it shares weaknesses with similarly absolutist moral stances (notably, deontological ones). A scenario (or thought experiment) used to clarify this problem (often attributed to Immanuel Kant) posits both

1. you know the location of some persons
2. a murderer asks you about their location in order to go and kill them.

The moral convention is that lying is wrong, so the strong rule utilitarian says you should reveal their location. A more sophisticated SRU response is that

1. the above scenario is very improbable.
2. in the majority of situations, telling the truth leads to more trust and happiness.
3. if applied universally (à la Kant's categorical imperative), the rule against lying would create net utility. This position is most notably argued by John C. Harsanyi (in an essay included in "Utilitarianism and beyond", edited by A. Sen and B. Williams, Reprint 2010).

Nevertheless, many disagree, claiming that (in this situation) telling the truth would result in needless death, would therefore be immoral, and that this scenario thus provides a counterexample contradicting SRU. It could also be argued that this constitutes a conflict between multiple moral rules, "Don't lie" and "Don't kill people". By telling the murderer the location, you are assisting in their murder, which is morally comparable to killing them.

== Weak rule utilitarianism ==
Weak rule utilitarianism (WRU) attempts to handle SRU counterexamples as legitimate exceptions. One such response is two-level utilitarianism; more systematic WRUs attempt to create sub-rules to handle the exceptions. But as David Lyons and others have argued, this will necessarily tend to collapse into act utilitarianism. Rules will require as many sub-rules as there are exceptions, thus many exceptions will make the more-sophisticated rule computationally intractable. Rational agents will then satisfice that intractability by seeking outcomes that produce the maximum utility.

== See also ==
- Act utilitarianism
- Brad Hooker
- Guideline
- Harm principle
- Prima facie right
- Proportionalism
- Richard Brandt
- Rule egoism
- Thought experiments in ethics
