= Negative consequentialism =

Version of consequentialism

Negative consequentialism is a version of consequentialism, which is "one of the major theories of normative ethics." Like other versions of consequentialism, negative consequentialism holds that moral right and wrong depend only on the value of outcomes. That is, for negative and other versions of consequentialism, questions such as "what should I do?" and "what kind of person should I be?" are answered only based on consequences. Negative consequentialism differs from other versions of consequentialism by giving greater weight in moral deliberations to what is bad (e.g. suffering or injustice) than what is good (e.g. happiness or justice). Due to this, it can be considered an instance of what has been called "suffering-focused ethics", the view that the reduction of suffering has moral priority over any other possible duties we may think of.

== Negative utilitarianism ==
A specific type of consequentialism is utilitarianism, which says that the consequences that matter are those that affect aggregate well-being. Consequentialism is broader than utilitarianism in that consequentialism can say that the value of outcomes depend on other things than well-being; for example, justice, fairness, and equality, or in that it can say that the value of outcomes depend on well-being but not necessarily aggregate well-being (as it happens, for instance, with prioritarianism, which promotes achieving the higher level of happiness minus suffering but giving priority to the well-being of the worse off). Negative utilitarianism is thus a form of negative consequentialism. Much more has been written explicitly about negative utilitarianism than directly about negative consequentialism, although since negative utilitarianism is a form of negative consequentialism, everything that has been written about negative utilitarianism is by definition about a specific (utilitarian) version of negative consequentialism. Similarly to how there are many variations of consequentialism and negative utilitarianism, there are many versions of negative consequentialism, for example negative prioritarianism and negative consequentialist egalitarianism.

== People ==
G. E. Moore's ethics can be said to be a negative consequentialism (more precisely, a consequentialism with a negative utilitarian component), because he has been labeled a consequentialist, and he said that "consciousness of intense pain is, by itself, a great evil" whereas "the mere consciousness of pleasure, however intense, does not, by itself, appear to be a great good, even if it has some slight intrinsic value. In short, pain (if we understand by this expression, the consciousness of pain) appears to be a far worse evil than pleasure is a good." Moore wrote in the first half of the 20th century before any of the terms 'consequentialism,' 'negative utilitarianism' or 'negative consequentialism' were coined, and he did not use the term 'negative consequentialism' himself. Similarly to Moore, Ingemar Hedenius defended a consequentialism that could be called negative (or could be said to have a negative utilitarian component) because he assigned more importance to suffering than to happiness. Hedenius saw the worst in life, such as infernalistic suffering, as so evil that calculations of happiness versus suffering become unnecessary; he did not see that such evil could be counterbalanced by any good, such as happiness.

== Apologists ==
Philosophy professor Clark Wolf defends "negative consequentialism as a component of a larger theory of justice."

Walter Sinnott-Armstrong interprets Bernard Gert's moral system as a "sophisticated form of negative objective universal public rule consequentialism."

Jamie Mayerfeld argues for a strong duty to relieve suffering, which can be consequentialist in form. He says that "suffering is more bad than happiness is good," and that "the lifelong bliss of many people, no matter how many, cannot justify our allowing the lifelong torture of one."

David Pearce argues for the primary moral urgency of the eradication of suffering on the basis of negative consequentialism.

Negative consequentialism has also been defended as a compelling account of the asymmetry in population ethics, which is the idea that it is wrong to create an unhappy life but not necessarily wrong not to create a happy life.

== See also ==
- Ahimsa
- Antifrustrationism
- Asymmetry (population ethics)
- Consequentialism
- Effective altruism
- Eradication of suffering
- Negative reinforcement
- Negative utilitarianism
- Prioritarianism
- Suffering-focused ethics
- Suffering risks
