= Negative utilitarianism =

Philosophical aim of minimizing suffering

Negative utilitarianism (NU) is a form of negative consequentialism that can be described as the view that people should minimize the total amount of aggregate suffering, or that they should minimize suffering and then, secondarily, maximize the total amount of happiness. It can be regarded as a version of utilitarianism that gives greater priority to reducing suffering (negative utility or "disutility") than to increasing pleasure (positive utility). This differs from classical utilitarianism, which does not claim that reducing suffering is intrinsically more important than increasing happiness. Both versions of utilitarianism, however, hold that whether an action is morally right or wrong depends solely on whether it promotes or decreases net well-being. Such well-being consists of both positive and negative aspects, that is, it is the sum of what is good and what is bad for individuals.

Negative utilitarianism would thus differ from other consequentialist views, such as negative prioritarianism or negative egalitarianism. While these other theories would also support minimizing suffering, they would give special weight to reducing the suffering of those who are worse off.

The term "negative utilitarianism" is used by some authors to denote the theory that reducing negative well-being is the only thing that ultimately matters morally. Others distinguish between "strong" and "weak" versions of negative utilitarianism, where strong versions are only concerned with reducing negative well-being, and weak versions say that both positive and negative well-being matter but that negative well-being matters more.

Other versions of negative utilitarianism differ in how much weight they give to negative well-being ('disutility') compared to positive well-being (positive utility), as well as the different conceptions of what well-being (utility) is. For example, negative preference utilitarianism says that the well-being in an outcome depends on frustrated preferences. Negative hedonistic utilitarianism thinks of well-being in terms of pleasant and unpleasant experiences. There are many other variations on how negative utilitarianism can be specified.

The term "negative utilitarianism" was introduced by R. Ninian Smart in 1958 in his reply to Karl Popper's The Open Society and Its Enemies. Smart also presented the most famous argument against negative utilitarianism: that negative utilitarianism would entail that a ruler who is able to instantly and painlessly destroy the human race would have a duty to do so. Furthermore, every human being would have a moral responsibility to commit suicide, thereby preventing future suffering. Many authors have endorsed the rationale behind these arguments against negative utilitarianism.

== History ==
The term "negative utilitarianism" was introduced by R. N. Smart in his 1958 reply to Karl Popper's book The Open Society and Its Enemies, published in 1945. In the book, Popper emphasizes the importance of preventing suffering in public policy. The ideas in negative utilitarianism have similarities with ancient traditions such as Jainism and Buddhism. Ancient Greek philosopher Hegesias of Cyrene has been said to be "one of the earliest exponents of NU [Negative Utilitarianism]." In more recent times, ideas similar to negative utilitarianism can be found in the works of 19th century psychologist Edmund Gurney who wrote:

Enough suffering will always remain to make the question of the desirability ... of their sojourn on earth a question which numbers will answer ... in the negative.... When we forget pain, or underestimate it, or talk about people "getting used to it", we are really so far losing sight of what the universe, which we wish to conceive adequately, really is.

Discussions and writings about negative utilitarianism have become increasingly common, particularly in recent decades. While the term was relatively rare before the late 20th century, it has experienced a significant surge in usage since then. This could be attributed to various factors, such as the rise of movements focused on global suffering and the increasing accessibility of information.

Present figures include David Pearce, a leading advocate of negative utilitarianism who has extensively explored its implications for future technological and ethical advancements. In his work The Hedonistic Imperative, Pearce argues for the use of biotechnology to eradicate suffering in all sentient beings.

== Versions ==
Like other kinds of utilitarianism, negative utilitarianism can take many forms depending on what specific claims are taken to constitute the theory. For example, negative preference utilitarianism says that the utility of an outcome depends on frustrated preferences. Negative hedonistic utilitarianism thinks of utility in terms of hedonic mental states such as suffering and unpleasantness. Negative Average Preference Utilitarianism makes the same assumptions on what is good as negative preference utilitarianism, but states that the average number (per individual) of preferences frustrated should be minimized. Versions of (negative) utilitarianism can also differ based on whether the actual or expected consequences matter, and whether the aim is stated in terms of the average outcome among individuals or the total net utility (or lack of disutility) among them. Negative utilitarianism can aim either to optimize the value of the outcome or it can be a satisficing negative utilitarianism, according to which an action ought to be taken if and only if the outcome would be sufficiently valuable (or have sufficiently low disvalue). A key way in which negative utilitarian views can differ from one another is with respect to how much weight they give to negative well-being (disutility) compared to positive well-being (positive utility). This is a key area of variation because the key difference between negative utilitarianism and non-negative kinds of utilitarianism is that negative utilitarianism gives more weight to negative well-being.

=== The weight of evil (disutility) ===
Philosophers Gustaf Arrhenius and Krister Bykvist develop a taxonomy of negative utilitarian views based on how the views weigh disutility against positive utility. In total, they distinguish among 16 kinds of negative utilitarianism. They first distinguish between strong negativism and weak negativism. Strong negativism "give all weight to disutility" and weak negativism "give some weight to positive utility, but more weight to disutility." The most commonly discussed subtypes are probably two versions of weak negative utilitarianism called "lexical" and "lexical threshold" negative utilitarianism. According to "lexical" negative utilitarianism, positive utility gets weight only when outcomes are equal with respect to disutility. That is, positive utility functions as a tiebreaker in that it determines which outcome is better (or less bad) when the outcomes considered have equal disutility. "Lexical threshold" negative utilitarianism says that there is some disutility, for instance some extreme suffering, such that no positive utility can counterbalance it. 'Consent-based' negative utilitarianism is a specification of lexical threshold negative utilitarianism, which specifies where the threshold should be located. It says that if an individual is suffering and would at that moment not "agree to continue the suffering in order to obtain something else in the future" then the suffering cannot be outweighed by any happiness.

=== Other distinctions among versions of negative utilitarianism ===
Thomas Metzinger proposes the "principle of negative utilitarianism", which is the broad idea that suffering should be minimized when possible. Mario Bunge writes about negative utilitarianism in his Treatise on Basic Philosophy but in a different sense than most others. In Bunge's sense, negative utilitarianism is about not harming. In contrast, most other discussion of negative utilitarianism takes it to imply a duty both not to harm and to help (at least in the sense of reducing negative well-being).

Tranquilist axiology, closely related to negative utilitarianism, states that "an individual experiential moment is as good as it can be for her if and only if she has no craving for change." According to tranquilism, happiness and pleasure have no intrinsic value, only instrumental value. From this perspective, positive experiences superficially appear to have intrinsic value because these experiences substitute for, distract from, or relieve suffering or dissatisfaction that an agent would have otherwise faced in the absence of such experiences.

== The benevolent world-exploder ==
R. N. Smart introduced the term "negative utilitarianism" in a 1958 article and argued against it, stating that negative utilitarianism would entail that a ruler who is able to instantly and painlessly destroy the human race, "a benevolent world-exploder", would have a duty to do so. This is the most famous argument against negative utilitarianism, and it is directed against sufficiently strong versions of negative utilitarianism. Many authors have endorsed this argument, and some have presented counterarguments against it. Below are replies to this argument that have been presented and discussed.

=== Cooperation between different value systems ===
One possible reply to this argument is that only a naive interpretation of negative utilitarianism would endorse world destruction. The conclusion can be mitigated by pointing out the importance of cooperation between different value systems. There are good consequentialist reasons why one should be cooperative towards other value systems and it is particularly important to avoid doing something harmful to other value systems. The destruction of the world would strongly violate many other value systems and endorsing it would therefore be uncooperative. Since there are many ways to reduce suffering which do not infringe on other value systems, it makes sense for negative utilitarians to focus on these options. In an extended interpretation of negative utilitarianism, cooperation with other value systems is considered and the conclusion is that it is better to reduce suffering without violating other value systems.

=== Eliminating vs. reducing disutility ===
Another reply to the benevolent world-exploder argument is that it does not distinguish between eliminating and reducing negative well-being, and that negative utilitarianism should plausibly be formulated in terms of reducing and not eliminating. A counterargument to that reply is that elimination is a form of reduction, similar to how zero is a number.

=== Attempting world destruction would be counterproductive ===
Several philosophers have argued that to try to destroy the world (or to kill many people) would be counterproductive from a negative utilitarian perspective. One such argument is provided by David Pearce, who says that "planning and implementing the extinction of all sentient life couldn't be undertaken painlessly. Even contemplating such an enterprise would provoke distress. Thus a negative utilitarian is not compelled to argue for the apocalyptic solution." Instead, Pearce advocates the use of biotechnology to phase out the biology of suffering throughout the living world, and he says that "life-long happiness can be genetically pre-programmed." A similar reply to the similar claim that negative utilitarianism would imply that we should kill off the miserable and needy is that we rarely face policy choices and that "anyway there are excellent utilitarian reasons for avoiding such a policy, since people would find out about it and become even more miserable and fearful." The Negative Utilitarianism FAQ's answer to question "3.2 Should NUs try to increase extinction risk?" begins with "No, that would be very bad even by NU standards."

=== Life could evolve again in a worse way ===
Some replies to the benevolent world-exploder argument take the form that even if the world were destroyed, that would or might be bad from a negative utilitarian perspective. One such reply provided by John W. N. Watkins is that even if life were destroyed, life could evolve again, perhaps in a worse way. So the world-exploder would need to destroy the possibility of life, but that is in principle beyond human power. To this, J. J. C. Smart replies,

I am also a little puzzled by Watkin's remark that the pain minimizer would have to destroy the very possibility of life. If the sentient forms of life were totally destroyed, it might be that the sentient forms would be most unlikely to evolve. This is on the supposition, held by some experts, that the evolution of higher forms of life on earth depended on a lot of lucky accidents. If this is not the case, then the benevolent world destroyer should ensure that all forms of life are destroyed, even bacteria and plants and insects, but should this be impossible the world destroyer might have at least ensured a pain free globe for hundreds of millions of years to come. In any case my brother's example was of a world exploder, and I think this would ensure the destruction of all life on earth. Of course there might be sentient life on planets of distant stars. No doubt the world exploder can do nothing about this, even with the resources of a future physics, but his or her negative utilitarian duty would not be to do the impossible, but would be to minimize suffering as much as lies within his or her power.

But in their article The expected value of extinction risk reduction is positive, Brauner and Grosse-Holz quote David Pearce:

For example, one might naively suppose that a negative utilitarian would welcome human extinction. But only (trans)humans – or our potential superintelligent successors – are technically capable of phasing out the cruelties of the rest of the living world on Earth. And only (trans)humans – or rather our potential superintelligent successors – are technically capable of assuming stewardship of our entire Hubble volume.

=== Being killed would be a great evil ===
Another oft-cited reply to the "world-exploder" argument is that getting killed would be a great evil. Erich Kadlec defends negative utilitarianism and addresses the benevolent world-exploder argument (partially) as follows: "[R. N. Smart] also dispenses with the generally known fact that all people (with a few exceptions in extreme situations) like to live and would consider being killed not a benefit but as the greatest evil done to them."

=== Frustrated preferences ===
Negative preference utilitarianism has a preferentialist conception of well-being. That is, it is bad for an individual to get his aversions fulfilled (or preferences frustrated), and depending on the version of negative utilitarianism, it may also be good for him to get his preferences satisfied. A negative utilitarian with such a conception of well-being, or whose conception of well-being includes such a preferentialist component, could reply to the benevolent world-exploder argument by saying that the explosion would be bad because it would fulfill many individuals' aversions. Arrhenius and Bykvist provide two criticisms of this reply. First, it could be claimed that frustrated preferences require that someone exists who has the frustrated preference. But if everyone is dead there are no preferences and hence no badness. Second, even if a world-explosion would involve frustrated preferences that would be bad from a negative preference utilitarian perspective, such a negative utilitarian should still favor it as the lesser of two evils compared to all the frustrated preferences that would likely exist if the world continued to exist.

The Negative Utilitarianism FAQ suggests two replies to Arrhenius and Bykvist's first type of criticism (the criticism that if no one exists anymore then there are no frustrated preferences anymore): The first reply is that past preferences count, even if the individual who held them no longer exists. The second is that "instead of counting past preferences, one could look at the matter in terms of life-goals. The earlier the death of a person who wants to go on living, the more unfulfilled her life-goal." The Negative Utilitarianism FAQ also replies to Arrhenius and Bykvist's second type of criticism. The reply is (in part) that the criticism relies on the empirical premise that there would be more frustrated preferences in the future if the world continued to exist than if the world was destroyed. But that negative preference utilitarianism would say that extinction would be better (in theory), assuming that premise, should not count substantially against the theory, because for any view on population ethics that assigns disvalue to something, one can imagine future scenarios such that extinction would be better according to the given view.

=== Combining negative utilitarianism with rights ===
A part of Clark Wolf's response to the benevolent world-exploder objection is that negative utilitarianism can be combined with a theory of rights. He says:

A more direct way to address this problem would be to incorporate a theory of rights, stipulating that in general, policy makers simply have no right to make decisions about whether the lives of others are worth living, or whether they should live or die. Since it is clear that policy makers have no right to kill off the miserable and destitute, this response gains support from our moral intuitions.

Negative utilitarianism can be combined, in particular, with Rawls' theory of justice. Rawls knew Popper's normative claims and may have been influenced by his concern for the worst-off.

=== Classical utilitarianism may also entail world destruction ===
For someone who believes that consequentialism in general is true, yet is uncertain between classical and negative utilitarianism, the world destruction argument is not fatal to negative utilitarianism if there are similar hypothetical scenarios in which a classical utilitarian (but not a negative utilitarian) would be obligated to destroy the world in order to replace those killed by new individuals. Simon Knutsson writes:

There are scenarios in which traditional utilitarianism, but not negative utilitarianism, implies that it would be right to kill everyone, namely, scenarios in which the killing would increase both positive and negative well-being and result in a greater sum of positive minus negative well-being. Negative utilitarianism does not imply that it would be right to kill everyone in such scenarios because, in these scenarios, killing everyone would increase negative well-being. An example of such a scenario is that all humans or all sentient beings on Earth could be killed and replaced with many more beings who, collectively, experience both more positive well-being and more negative well-being, but with a greater sum of positive minus negative well-being.

== Other works ==
Toby Ord provides a critique of negative utilitarianism in his essay "Why I'm Not a Negative Utilitarian", to which David Pearce, Bruno Contestabile and Magnus Vinding have replied. Other critical views of negative utilitarianism are provided by Thaddeus Metz, Christopher Belshaw, and Ingmar Persson.

Joseph Mendola develops a modification of utilitarianism, and he says that his principle:

is a kind of maximin rule.... The principle also resembles a form of utilitarianism which is familiar from the work of Popper and the Smart brothers, negative utilitarianism. That too suggests we should concern ourselves before all else with the elimination of pain.

Professor Henry Hiz writes favorably of negative utilitarianism.

Fabian Fricke published the German article "Verschiedene Versionen des negativen Utilitarismus".

In book format, Jonathan Leighton has defended a variation of negative utilitarianism he terms "xNU+", with the "x" placing particular emphasis on the prevention of extreme suffering, and the "+" accommodating deep human intuitions, including the desire to exist and to thrive.

== See also ==
- Ahimsa – Ancient Indian principle of nonviolence
- Antifrustrationism – Axiological position which prioritizes avoiding preference frustration
- Antinatalism – Value judgment that procreation is unethical
- Eradication of suffering – Biotechnological elimination of involuntary suffering
- Harm principle – Principle stating that the actions of individuals should be limited only to prevent harm to other individuals
- Negative consequentialism – Version of consequentialism that prioritizes reducing bad outcomes
- Epicureanism, also known as negative hedonism – Hedonistic philosophy that views the absence of pain and fear as the greatest pleasure
- Negative reinforcement – In operant conditioning, reinforcement of behavior that avoids aversive stimulus (e.g. pain)
- Painism – Position that all beings who feel pain deserve rights
- Philosophical pessimism – View that life and existence are of negative value
- Prioritarianism – Utilitarian view that gives priority to the worse off
- Speciesism – Prejudice in favor of one's own species and against other species
- Suffering-focused ethics – Ethical views prioritising the reduction of suffering
- Suffering risks – Scenarios of large amounts of future suffering
- Veganism – Practice of abstaining from animal source foods and animal products, and an associated philosophy that rejects the commodification of animals
- Wild animal suffering – Suffering of wild animals due to natural processes
