= Pain (philosophy) =

Philosophical concept about physical pain and suffering

Philosophy of pain may be about suffering in general or more specifically about physical pain. The experience of pain is, due to its seeming universality, a very good portal through which to view various aspects of human life. Discussions in philosophy of mind concerning qualia has given rise to a body of knowledge called philosophy of pain, which is about pain in the narrow sense of physical pain, and which must be distinguished from philosophical works concerning pain in the broad sense of suffering. This article covers both topics.

== Historical views of pain ==
Two near contemporaries in the 18th and 19th centuries, Jeremy Bentham and the Marquis de Sade had very different views on these matters. Bentham saw pain and pleasure as objective phenomena, and defined utilitarianism on that principle. However the Marquis de Sade offered a wholly different view – which is that pain itself has an ethics, and that pursuit of pain, or imposing it, may be as useful and just as pleasurable, and that this indeed is the purpose of the state – to indulge the desire to inflict pain in revenge, for instance, via the law (in his time most punishment was in fact the dealing out of pain). The 19th-century view in Europe was that Bentham's view had to be promoted, de Sade's (which it found painful) suppressed so intensely that it – as de Sade predicted – became a pleasure in itself to indulge. The Victorian culture is often cited as the best example of this hypocrisy.

Various 20th century philosophers (viz. J.J.C. Smart, David Kellogg Lewis, D.M. Armstrong) have commented upon the meaning of pain and what it can tell us about the nature of human experiences. Pain has also been the subject of various socio-philosophical treatises. Michel Foucault, for example, observed that the biomedical model of pain, and the shift away from pain-inducing punishments, was part of a general Enlightenment invention of Man.

Transhumanist philosophers such as David Pearce and Mark Alan Walker have argued that future technology will eventually make it feasible to eradicate pain and suffering entirely. Pearce argues that physical pain could be replaced with "gradients of bliss" that provide the same functionality of pain, e.g. avoiding injury, but without the suffering. Walker coined the term "biohappiness" to describe the idea of directly manipulating the biological roots of happiness in order to increase it. Pearce argues that suffering could eventually be eradicated entirely, stating that: "It is predicted that the world's last unpleasant experience will be a precisely dateable event." Proposed technological methods of overcoming the hedonic treadmill include wireheading (direct brain stimulation for uniform bliss), which undermines motivation and evolutionary fitness; designer drugs, offering sustainable well-being without side effects, though impractical for lifelong reliance; and genetic engineering, the most promising approach. Genetic recalibration through hyperthymia-promoting genes could raise hedonic set-points, fostering adaptive well-being, creativity, and productivity while maintaining responsiveness to stimuli. While scientifically achievable, this transformation requires careful ethical and societal considerations to navigate its profound implications.

== The individuality of pain ==
It is often accepted as a priori principle that one has inherent knowledge of one's own consciousness simply by virtue of dwelling within an "inner world" of the mind. This drastic distinction between inner world and outer world was most popularized by René Descartes when he solidified his principle of Cartesian dualism. From the centrality of one's own consciousness springs a fundamental problem of other minds, the discussion of which has often centered on pain. Some scholars refer to psychological pain as an internalized state of suffering. This is opposed to the kind of sensation one gets from hitting one's leg against a stone.

== Pain and theories of mind ==
The experience of pain has been used by various philosophers to analyze various types of philosophy of mind, such as dualism, identity theory, or functionalism. David Lewis, in his article 'Mad pain and Martian pain', gives examples of various types of pain to support his own flavor of functionalism. He defines mad pain to be pain which occurs in a madman who has somehow gotten his "wires crossed" (possibly an early observation distinguishing normal pain from either clinical psychalgia or schizophreniac pain) in such a way that what we usually call "pain" does not cause him to cry or roll in agony, but instead to, for example, become very concentrated and good at mathematics. Martian pain is, to him, pain which occupies the same causal role as our pain, but has a very different physical realization (e.g. the Martian feels pain due to the activation of an elaborate internal hydraulic system rather than, for example, the firing of C-fibers). Both of these phenomena, Lewis claims, are pain, and must be accounted for in any coherent theory of mind.

Valence is an inferred criterion from instinctively generated emotions; it is the property specifying whether feelings/affects are positive, negative or neutral. The existence of at least temporarily unspecified valence is an issue for psychological researchers who reject the existence of neutral emotions (e.g. surprise, sublimation). However, other psychological researchers assume that neutral emotions exist. Two contrasting views in the phenomenology of valence are that of a constrained valence psychology, where the most intense experiences are generally no more than 10 times more intense than the mildest, and the Heavy-Tailed Valence hypothesis, which states that the range of possible degrees of valence is far more extreme.

Some philosophers question whether the structure of affective experience supports a strict positive-negative valence binary. For example, it has been argued that while suffering is clearly negatively valenced, introspective attempts to identify a phenomenologically opposite state—such as “anti-suffering”—fail to reveal a distinct experiential counterpart. This suggests that valence may not always correspond to simple oppositional categories. Rather than a linear scale, emotional valence might reflect a more complex and asymmetrical space of affective states, where the absence of suffering is not necessarily equivalent to the presence of pleasure.

== See also ==
- Nociception
- Pain
- Pain asymbolia
- Perception
- Suffering
