= Suffering-focused ethics =

Ethical views prioritising the reduction of suffering

Suffering-focused ethics are views in ethics that give special priority to the reduction of suffering. Some suffering-focused views hold that reducing suffering is the only moral aim, while others treat it as one aim among others, such as reducing inequality or promoting pleasure, but give it greater weight than those other aims.

== Types of suffering-focused ethics ==
The term "suffering-focused ethics" covers several normative positions that give priority to reducing suffering. One example is negative consequentialism. On this view, actions should be assessed according to whether they bring about states of affairs with less suffering. A form of negative consequentialism is negative utilitarianism, according to which one should seek to minimise aggregate suffering, counting each individual's suffering equally.

Other suffering-focused views are non-consequentialist. In suffering-focused deontological ethics, the duty to reduce suffering is treated as especially weighty and may override other duties, though it may itself be overridden in some cases. On such views, this duty should be followed even when violating it would produce a better overall outcome.

Some suffering-focused views concern moral character. On these views, the aim of a moral agent is to develop attitudes and dispositions oriented towards reducing suffering. These may be described in terms of virtue, or in terms of care and responsiveness to suffering.

== Suffering-focused ethics and negative ethics ==
Some suffering-focused views have been described in philosophical literature as "negative" views, because they prioritise the reduction of negative value over the promotion of positive value. The term remains common in names such as negative consequentialism and negative utilitarianism.

== Role of positive value ==
Suffering-focused views differ over whether values other than the reduction of suffering have moral importance. Some views deny that positive values matter in themselves, and hold that only negative values are morally relevant. Other views, such as tranquilist views, allow that positive states may be valuable, but only instrumentally, insofar as they prevent or reduce suffering.

Lexical views hold that some values have priority over others in such a way that they cannot be outweighed by lesser values. In suffering-focused versions of these views, reducing suffering takes absolute precedence over promoting value, even though the latter is worth pursuing when reducing suffering is unfeasible.

Moderate suffering-focused views give greater moral weight to reducing suffering than to promoting other values or reducing other disvalues, while still treating those other concerns as morally relevant.

== Arguments in favour ==
Supporters of suffering-focused views have argued that they can account for asymmetries in population ethics. One proposed asymmetry is that there is no obligation to bring into existence an individual whose life would be good, but there is an obligation not to bring into existence an individual whose life would be bad. Suffering-focused views can explain this asymmetry by giving priority to avoiding the creation of suffering over creating happiness.

A related argument appeals to the view that it may be permissible not to benefit others, but impermissible to cause them suffering. Jamie Mayerfeld argues that many people would reject causing one person suffering in order to produce a slightly greater amount of pleasure for another person.

Another argument holds that there is an asymmetry between happiness and suffering because suffering has urgency, especially in severe cases, whereas the absence of pleasure does not necessarily present an urgent problem requiring relief.

Some writers also argue that suffering, including severe suffering, is widespread and can often be reduced, while intense positive experiences are rarer and harder to create.

== Criticism of the symmetry between suffering and happiness ==
Some normative views, including some forms of utilitarianism, treat suffering and happiness symmetrically, in the sense that a given quantity n of suffering can be offset by a given quantity n of happiness. Karl Popper criticised this idea, arguing that utilitarianism mistakenly assumes a continuous pleasure-pain scale on which degrees of pain can be balanced against degrees of pleasure. According to Magnus Vinding, Popper's view rejects the idea that one person's suffering can be morally outweighed by another person's happiness.

Thomas Metzinger has also argued against a simple symmetry between suffering and happiness. He describes suffering as involving an "urgency of change", in contrast with neutral or untroubled states, which do not demand relief in the same way.

Some writers have argued that experiences regarded as neutral may be affected by subtle dissatisfaction that goes unnoticed through habituation. On this view, some pursuits of happiness may instead be attempts to escape dissatisfaction, which would support giving priority to the reduction of suffering.

Animal rights advocate Richard D. Ryder wrote in 2005, "One of the problems with the utilitarian view is that, for example, the sufferings of a gang-rape victim can be justified if the rape gives a greater sum total of pleasure to the rapists."

== See also ==
- Antifrustrationism – Axiological position which prioritizes avoiding preference frustration
- Antinatalism – Value judgment that procreation is unethical
- Buddhist ethics – Ethics and code of conduct in Buddhism
- Effective altruism – Philosophical and social movement
- Eradication of suffering – Biotechnological elimination of involuntary suffering
- Negative consequentialism – Version of consequentialism
- Negative reinforcement – Consequence affecting an organism's future behavior
- Negative utilitarianism – Philosophical aim of minimizing suffering
- Pain (philosophy) – Philosophical concept about suffering in general or more specifically about physical pain
- Prioritarianism – View within ethics and political philosophy
- Painism (an ethical framework by Richard D. Ryder) – English animal rights advocate (born 1940)
- Philosophical pessimism – View that life and existence are of negative value
- Speciesism – Philosophical term on species treatment
- Suffering – Pain, mental, or emotional unhappiness
- Suffering risks – Scenarios of large amounts of future suffering
- Wild animal suffering – Suffering of wild animals due to natural processes
