= Suffering =

Pain, mental, or emotional unhappiness

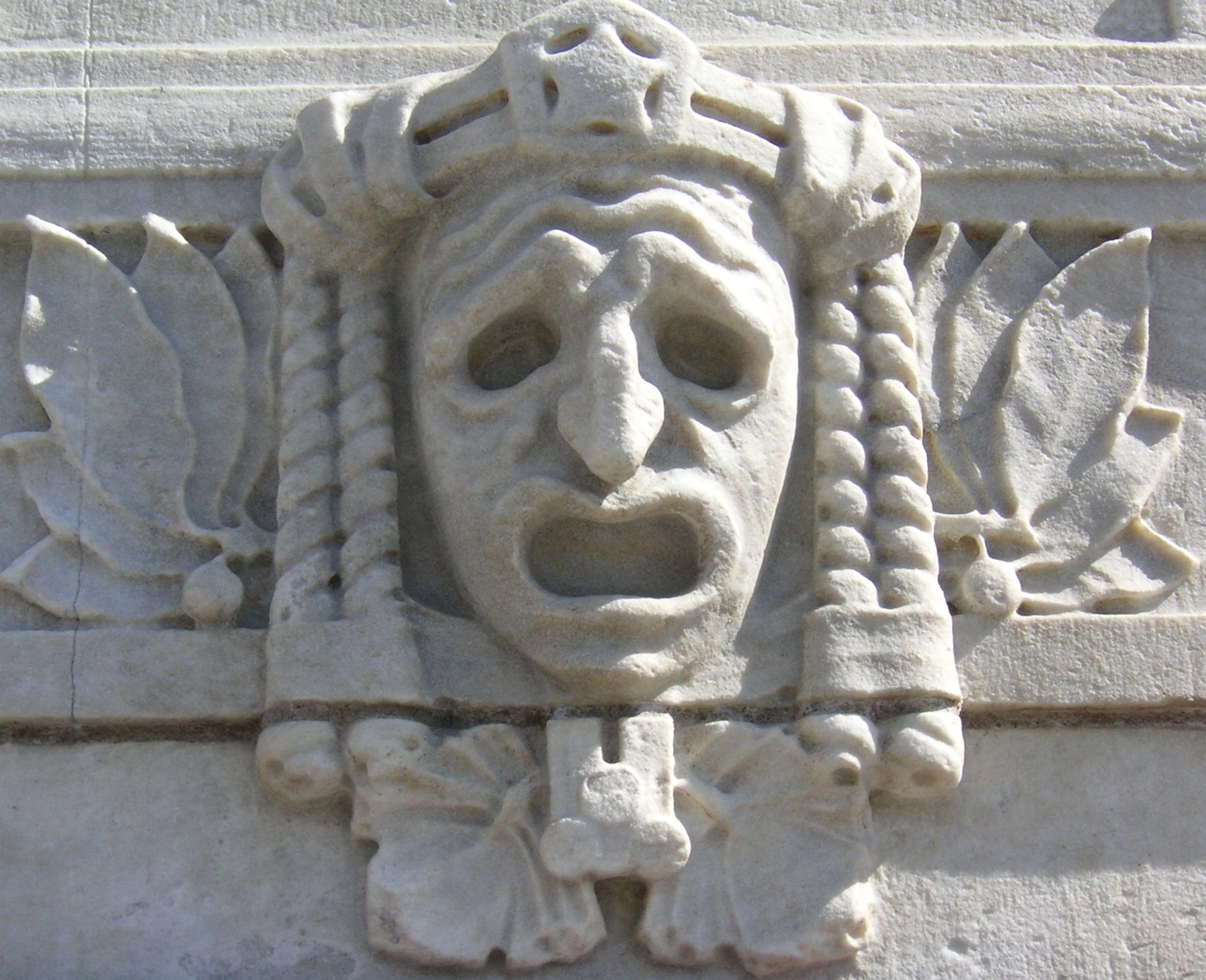
Tragic mask on the façade of the Royal Dramatic Theatre in Stockholm, Sweden

Suffering, or pain in a broad sense, may be an experience of unpleasantness or aversion, possibly associated with the perception of harm or threat of harm in an individual. Suffering is the basic element that makes up the negative valence of affective phenomena. The opposite of suffering is pleasure or happiness.

Suffering is often categorized as physical or mental. It may come in all degrees of intensity, from mild to intolerable. Factors of duration and frequency of occurrence usually compound those of intensity. Attitudes toward suffering may vary widely, in the sufferer or other people, according to how much it is regarded as avoidable or unavoidable, useful or useless, deserved or undeserved.

Suffering occurs in the lives of sentient beings in numerous manners, often dramatically. As a result, many fields of human activity are concerned with some aspects of suffering. These aspects may include the nature of suffering, its processes, its origin and causes, its meaning and significance, its related personal, social, and cultural behaviors, its remedies, management, and uses.

== Terminology ==
The word suffering is sometimes used in the narrow sense of physical pain, but more often it refers to psychological pain, or more often yet it refers to pain in the broad sense, i.e. to any unpleasant feeling, emotion or sensation. The word pain usually refers to physical pain, but it is also a common synonym of suffering. The words pain and suffering are often used both together in different ways. For instance, they may be used as interchangeable synonyms. Or they may be used in 'contradistinction' to one another, as in "pain is physical, suffering is mental", or "pain is inevitable, suffering is optional". Or they may be used to define each other, as in "pain is physical suffering", or "suffering is severe physical or mental pain".

Qualifiers, such as physical, mental, emotional, and psychological, are often used to refer to certain types of pain or suffering. In particular, mental pain (or suffering) may be used in relationship with physical pain (or suffering) for distinguishing between two wide categories of pain or suffering. A first caveat concerning such a distinction is that it uses physical pain in a sense that normally includes not only the 'typical sensory experience of physical pain' but also other unpleasant bodily experiences including air hunger, hunger, vestibular suffering, nausea, sleep deprivation, and itching. A second caveat is that the terms physical or mental should not be taken too literally: physical pain or suffering, as a matter of fact, happens through conscious minds and involves emotional aspects, while mental pain or suffering happens through physical brains and, being an emotion, involves important physiological aspects.

The word unpleasantness, which some people use as a synonym of suffering or pain in the broad sense, may refer to the basic affective dimension of pain (its suffering aspect), usually in contrast with the sensory dimension, as for instance in this sentence: "Pain-unpleasantness is often, though not always, closely linked to both the intensity and unique qualities of the painful sensation." Other current words that have a definition with some similarity to suffering include distress, unhappiness, misery, affliction, woe, ill, discomfort, displeasure, disagreeableness.

== Philosophy ==
=== Ancient Greek philosophy ===
Many of the Hellenistic philosophies addressed suffering.

In Cynicism suffering is alleviated by achieving mental clarity or lucidity (ἁτυφια: atyphia), developing self-sufficiency (αὐτάρκεια: autarky), equanimity, arete, love of humanity, parrhesia, and indifference to the vicissitudes of life (adiaphora).

For Pyrrhonism, suffering comes from dogmas (i.e. beliefs regarding non-evident matters), most particularly beliefs that certain things are either good or bad by nature. Suffering can be removed by developing epoche (suspension of judgment) regarding beliefs, which leads to ataraxia (mental tranquility).

Epicurus (contrary to common misperceptions of his doctrine) advocated that we should first seek to avoid suffering (aponia) and that the greatest pleasure lies in ataraxia, free from the worrisome pursuit or the unwelcome consequences of ephemeral pleasures. Epicureanism's version of Hedonism, as an ethical theory, claims that good and bad consist ultimately in pleasure and pain.

For Stoicism, the greatest good lies in reason and virtue, but the soul best reaches it through a kind of indifference (apatheia) to pleasure and pain: as a consequence, this doctrine has become identified with stern self-control in regard to suffering.

=== Modern philosophy ===
Jeremy Bentham developed hedonistic utilitarianism, a popular doctrine in ethics, politics, and economics. Bentham argued that the right act or policy was that which would cause "the greatest happiness of the greatest number". He suggested a procedure called hedonic or felicific calculus, for determining how much pleasure and pain would result from any action. John Stuart Mill improved and promoted the doctrine of hedonistic utilitarianism. Karl Popper, in The Open Society and Its Enemies, proposed a negative utilitarianism, which prioritizes the reduction of suffering over the enhancement of happiness when speaking of utility: "I believe that there is, from the ethical point of view, no symmetry between suffering and happiness, or between pain and pleasure. ... human suffering makes a direct moral appeal for help, while there is no similar call to increase the happiness of a man who is doing well anyway." David Pearce, for his part, advocates a utilitarianism that aims straightforwardly at the abolition of suffering through the use of biotechnology (see more details below in section Biology, neurology, psychology). Another aspect worthy of mention here is that many utilitarians since Bentham hold that the moral status of a being comes from its ability to feel pleasure and pain: therefore, moral agents should consider not only the interests of human beings but also those of (other) animals. Richard Ryder came to the same conclusion in his concepts of 'speciesism' and 'painism'. Peter Singer's writings, especially the book Animal Liberation, represent the leading edge of this kind of utilitarianism for animals as well as for people.

Another doctrine related to the relief of suffering is humanitarianism (see also humanitarian principles, humanitarian aid, and humane society). "Where humanitarian efforts seek a positive addition to the happiness of sentient beings, it is to make the unhappy happy rather than the happy happier. ... [Humanitarianism] is an ingredient in many social attitudes; in the modern world it has so penetrated into diverse movements ... that it can hardly be said to exist in itself."

Pessimists hold this world to be mainly bad, or even the worst possible, plagued with, among other things, unbearable and unstoppable suffering. Some identify suffering as the nature of the world and conclude that it would be better if life did not exist at all. Arthur Schopenhauer recommends us to take refuge in things like art, philosophy, loss of the will to live, and tolerance toward 'fellow-sufferers'.

Friedrich Nietzsche, first influenced by Schopenhauer, developed afterward quite another attitude, arguing that the suffering of life is productive, exalting the will to power, despising weak compassion or pity, and recommending us to embrace willfully the 'eternal return' of the greatest sufferings.

Some philosophers have questioned whether suffering has a genuine positive counterpart. A phenomenological argument presented by Magnus Vinding claims that while positive experiences such as joy or excitement are real, they do not serve as opposites to suffering in either phenomenological or axiological terms.

Philosophy of pain is a philosophical speciality that focuses on physical pain and is, through that, relevant to suffering in general.

== Religion ==
Suffering plays an important role in a number of religions, regarding matters such as the following: consolation or relief; moral conduct (do no harm, help the afflicted, show compassion); spiritual advancement through life hardships or through self-imposed trials (mortification of the flesh, penance, asceticism); ultimate destiny (salvation, damnation, hell). Theodicy deals with the problem of evil, which is the difficulty of reconciling the existence of an omnipotent and benevolent god with the existence of evil. "Several attempts were made to preserve together both monotheism and God’s attributes from types of dualism (e. g. Gnosticism, Paulicianism, Catharism) and the idea of God’s reduced number of attributes, due to the tension between the existence of evil and the divine omnipotence and omnibenevolence." A quintessential form of evil, for many people, is extreme suffering, especially in innocent children, or in creatures destined to an eternity of torments (see problem of hell).

The 'Four Noble Truths' of Buddhism are about dukkha, a term often translated as suffering. They state the nature of suffering, its cause, its cessation, and the way leading to its cessation, the Noble Eightfold Path. Buddhism considers liberation from dukkha and the practice of compassion (karuna) as basic for leading a holy life and attaining nirvana.

Hinduism holds that suffering follows naturally from personal negative behaviors in one's current life or in a past life (see karma in Hinduism). One must accept suffering as a just consequence and as an opportunity for spiritual progress. Thus the soul or true self, which is eternally free of any suffering, may come to manifest itself in the person, who then achieves liberation (moksha). Abstinence from causing pain or harm to other beings, called ahimsa, is a central tenet of Hinduism, and even more so of another Indian religion, Jainism (see ahimsa in Jainism).

In Judaism, suffering is often seen as a punishment for sins and a test of a person's faith, like the Book of Job illustrates.

For Christianity, redemptive suffering is the belief that human suffering, when accepted and offered up in union with the "passion" (flogging and crucifixion) of Jesus, can remit the just punishment for sins, and allow oneself to grow in the love of The Trinity, other people, and oneself. In the New Testament, the Greek word pathēma for 'suffering' occurs 16 times with several places for Christ, e.g., 2 Corinthian 1:5. The verb is paschō 'to suffer', occurring 42 times, e.g., Gospel of Matthews 16:12.

In Islam, the faithful must endure suffering with hope and faith, not resist or ask why, accept it as Allah's will and submit to it as a test of faith. Allah never asks more than can be endured. One must also work to alleviate the suffering of others, as well as one's own. Suffering is also seen as a blessing. Through that gift, the sufferer remembers Allah and connects with him. Suffering expunges the sins of human beings and cleanses their soul for the immense reward of the afterlife, and the avoidance of hell.

According to the Bahá'í Faith, all suffering is a brief and temporary manifestation of physical life, whose source is the material aspects of physical existence, and often attachment to them, whereas only joy exists in the spiritual worlds.

== Arts and literature ==
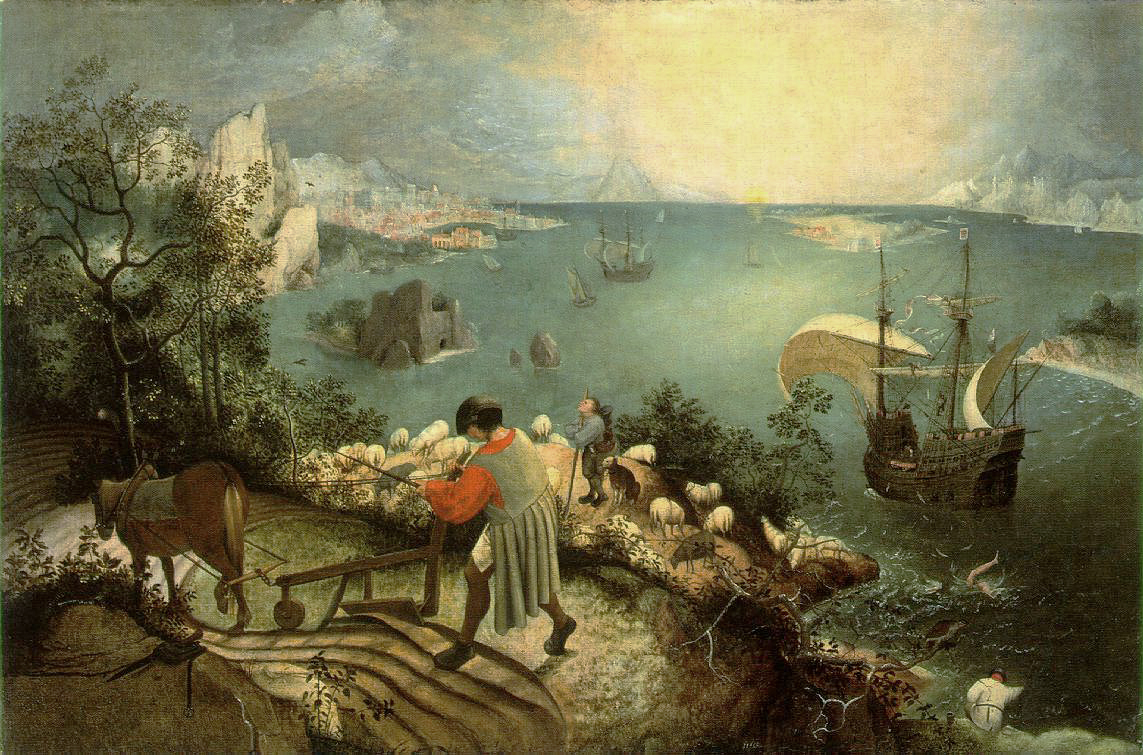
Landscape with the Fall of Icarus by Pieter Bruegel the Elder

Artistic and literary works often engage with suffering, sometimes at great cost to their creators or performers. Be it in the tragic, comic or other genres, art and literature offer means to alleviate (and perhaps also exacerbate) suffering, as argued for instance in Harold Schweizer's Suffering and the remedy of art.

This Bruegel painting is among those that inspired W. H. Auden's poem "Musée des Beaux Arts":

About suffering they were never wrong,
The Old Masters; how well, they understood
Its human position; how it takes place
While someone else is eating or opening a window or just walking dully along;
(...)
In Breughel's Icarus, for instance: how everything turns away
Quite leisurely from the disaster; (...)

== Social sciences ==
Social suffering, according to Arthur Kleinman and others, describes "collective and individual human suffering associated with life conditions shaped by powerful social forces". Such suffering is an increasing concern in medical anthropology, ethnography, mass media analysis, and Holocaust studies, says Iain Wilkinson, who is developing a sociology of suffering.

The Encyclopedia of World Problems and Human Potential is a work by the Union of International Associations. Its main databases are about world problems (56,564 profiles), global strategies and solutions (32,547 profiles), human values (3,257 profiles), and human development (4,817 profiles). It states that "the most fundamental entry common to the core parts is that of pain (or suffering)" and "common to the core parts is the learning dimension of new understanding or insight in response to suffering".

Ralph Siu, an American author, urged in 1988 the "creation of a new and vigorous academic discipline, called panetics, to be devoted to the study of the infliction of suffering", The International Society for Panetics was founded in 1991 to study and develop ways to reduce the infliction of human suffering by individuals acting through professions, corporations, governments, and other social groups.

In economics, the following notions relate not only to the matters suggested by their positive appellations, but to the matter of suffering as well: Well-being or Quality of life, Welfare economics, Happiness economics, Gross National Happiness, genuine progress indicator.

In law, "Pain and suffering" is a legal term that refers to the mental distress or physical pain endured by a plaintiff as a result of injury for which the plaintiff seeks redress. Assessments of pain and suffering are required to be made for attributing legal awards. In the Western world these are typically made by juries in a discretionary fashion and are regarded as subjective, variable, and difficult to predict, for instance in the US, UK, Australia and New Zealand. See also, in US law, Negligent infliction of emotional distress and Intentional infliction of emotional distress.

In management and organization studies, drawing on the work of Eric Cassell, suffering has been defined as the distress a person experiences when they perceive a threat to any aspect of their continued existence, whether physical, psychological, or social. Other researchers have noted that suffering results from an inability to control actions that usually define one's view of one's self and that the characteristics of suffering include the loss of autonomy, or the loss of valued relationships or sense of self. Suffering is therefore determined not by the threat itself but, rather, by its meaning to the individual and the threat to their personhood.

== Biology, neurology, psychology ==
Suffering and pleasure are respectively the negative and positive affects, or hedonic tones, or valences that psychologists often identify as basic in our emotional lives. The evolutionary role of physical and mental suffering, through natural selection, is primordial: it warns of threats, motivates coping (fight or flight, escapism), and reinforces negatively certain behaviors (see punishment, aversives). Despite its initial disrupting nature, suffering contributes to the organization of meaning in an individual's world and psyche. In turn, meaning determines how individuals or societies experience and deal with suffering.

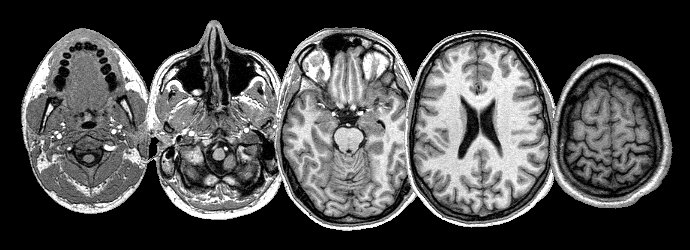
Neuroimaging sheds light on the seat of suffering.

Many brain structures and physiological processes are involved in suffering (particularly the anterior insula and cingulate cortex, both implicated in nociceptive and empathic pain). Various hypotheses try to account for the experience of suffering. One of these, the pain overlap theory takes note, thanks to neuroimaging studies, that the cingulate cortex fires up when the brain feels suffering from experimentally induced social distress, as well as physical pain. The theory proposes therefore that physical pain and social pain (i.e. two radically differing kinds of suffering) share a common phenomenological and neurological basis.

According to David Pearce's online manifesto "The Hedonistic Imperative", suffering is the avoidable result of Darwinian evolution. Pearce promotes replacing the biology of suffering with a robot-like response to noxious stimuli or with information-sensitive gradients of bliss, through genetic engineering and other technical scientific advances.

Different theories of psychology view suffering differently. Sigmund Freud viewed suffering as something humans are hardwired to avoid, while they are always in the pursuit of pleasure, also known as the hedonic theory of motivation or the pleasure principle. This dogma also ties in with certain concepts of Behaviorism, most notably Operant Conditioning theory. In operant conditioning, a negative stimulus is removed thereby increasing a desired behavior, alternatively an aversive stimulus can be introduced as a punishing factor. In both methods, unfavorable circumstances are used in order to motivate an individual or an animal towards a certain goal. However, other theories of psychology present contradicting ideas such as the idea that humans sometimes seek out suffering. Many existentialists believe suffering is necessary in order to find meaning in our lives. Existential Positive Psychology is a theory dedicated to exploring the relationship between suffering and happiness and the belief that true authentic happiness can only come from experiencing pain and hardships.

Hedonistic psychology, affective science, and affective neuroscience are some of the emerging scientific fields that could in the coming years focus their attention on the phenomenon of suffering.

== Health care ==
Disease and injury may contribute to suffering in humans and animals. For example, suffering may be a feature of mental or physical illness such as borderline personality disorder and occasionally in advanced cancer. Health care addresses this suffering in many ways, in subfields such as medicine, clinical psychology, psychotherapy, alternative medicine, hygiene, public health, and through various health care providers.

Health care approaches to suffering, however, remain problematic. Physician and author Eric Cassell, widely cited on the subject of attending to the suffering person as a primary goal of medicine, has defined suffering as "the state of severe distress associated with events that threaten the intactness of the person". Cassell writes: "The obligation of physicians to relieve human suffering stretches back to antiquity. Despite this fact, little attention is explicitly given to the problem of suffering in medical education, research or practice." Mirroring the traditional body and mind dichotomy that underlies its teaching and practice, medicine strongly distinguishes pain from suffering, and most attention goes to the treatment of pain. Nevertheless, physical pain itself still lacks adequate attention from the medical community, according to numerous reports. Besides, some medical fields like palliative care, pain management (or pain medicine), oncology, or psychiatry, do somewhat address suffering 'as such'. In palliative care, for instance, pioneer Cicely Saunders created the concept of 'total pain' ('total suffering' now say the textbooks), which encompasses the whole set of physical and mental distress, discomfort, symptoms, problems, or needs that a patient may experience hurtfully.

=== Mental illness ===
Gary Greenberg, in The Book of Woe, writes that mental illness might best be viewed as medicalization or labeling/naming suffering (i.e. that all mental illnesses might not necessarily be of dysfunction or biological-etiology, but might be social or cultural/societal).

== Relief and prevention in society ==
Since suffering is such a universal motivating experience, people, when asked, can relate their activities to its relief and prevention. Farmers, for instance, may claim that they prevent famine, artists may say that they take our minds off our worries, and teachers may hold that they hand down tools for coping with life hazards. In certain aspects of collective life, however, suffering is more readily an explicit concern by itself. Such aspects may include public health, human rights, humanitarian aid, disaster relief, philanthropy, economic aid, social services, insurance, and animal welfare. To these can be added the aspects of security and safety, which relate to precautionary measures taken by individuals or families, to interventions by the military, the police, the firefighters, and to notions or fields like social security, environmental security, and human security.

The nongovernmental research organization Center on Long-Term Risk, formerly known as the Foundational Research Institute, focuses on reducing risks of astronomical suffering (s-risks) from emerging technologies. Another organization also focused on research, the Center on Reducing Suffering, has a similar focus, with a stress on clarifying what priorities there should be at a practical level to attain the goal of reducing intense suffering in the future. The think-and-do tank Organisation for the Prevention of Intense Suffering (OPIS) advocates the prevention of intense suffering of all sentient beings as society’s highest ethical priority, working to embed this principle in societal decision-making and promoting effective solutions to some of the worst forms of suffering.

== Uses ==
Philosopher Leonard Katz wrote: "But Nature, as we now know, regards ultimately only fitness and not our happiness ... and does not scruple to use hate, fear, punishment and even war alongside affection in ordering social groups and selecting among them, just as she uses pain as well as pleasure to get us to feed, water and protect our bodies and also in forging our social bonds."

People make use of suffering for specific social or personal purposes in many areas of human life, as can be seen in the following instances:

- In arts, literature, or entertainment, people may use suffering for creation, for performance, or for enjoyment. Entertainment particularly makes use of suffering in blood sports and violence in the media, including violent video games depiction of suffering. A more or less great amount of suffering is involved in body art. The most common forms of body art include tattooing, body piercing, scarification, human branding. Another form of body art is a sub-category of performance art, in which for instance the body is mutilated or pushed to its physical limits.
- In business and various organizations, suffering may be used for constraining humans or animals into required behaviors.
- In a criminal context, people may use suffering for coercion, revenge, or pleasure.
- In interpersonal relationships, especially in places like families, schools, or workplaces, suffering is used for various motives, particularly under the form of abuse and punishment. In another fashion related to interpersonal relationships, the sick, or victims, or malingerers, may use suffering more or less voluntarily to get primary, secondary, or tertiary gain.
- In law, suffering is used for punishment (see penal law); victims may refer to what legal texts call "pain and suffering" to get compensation; lawyers may use a victim's suffering as an argument against the accused; an accused's or defendant's suffering may be an argument in their favor; authorities at times use light or heavy torture in order to get information or a confession.
- In the news media, suffering is often the raw material.
- In personal conduct, people may use suffering for themselves, in a positive way. Personal suffering may lead, if bitterness, depression, or spitefulness is avoided, to character-building, spiritual growth, or moral achievement; realizing the extent or gravity of suffering in the world may motivate one to relieve it and may give an inspiring direction to one's life. Alternatively, people may make self-detrimental use of suffering. Some may be caught in compulsive reenactment of painful feelings in order to protect them from seeing that those feelings have their origin in unmentionable past experiences; some may addictively indulge in disagreeable emotions like fear, anger, or jealousy, in order to enjoy pleasant feelings of arousal or release that often accompany these emotions; some may engage in acts of self-harm aimed at relieving otherwise unbearable states of mind.
- In politics, there is purposeful infliction of suffering in war, torture, and terrorism; people may use nonphysical suffering against competitors in nonviolent power struggles; people who argue for a policy may put forward the need to relieve, prevent or avenge suffering; individuals or groups may use past suffering as a political lever in their favor.
- In religion, suffering is used especially to grow spiritually, to expiate, to inspire compassion and help, to frighten, to punish.
- In rites of passage (see also hazing, ragging), rituals that make use of suffering are frequent.
- In science, humans and animals are subjected on purpose to aversive experiences for the study of suffering or other phenomena.
- In sex, especially in a context of sadism and masochism or BDSM, individuals may use a certain amount of physical or mental suffering (e.g. pain, humiliation).
- In sports, suffering may be used to outperform competitors or oneself; see sports injury, and no pain, no gain; see also blood sport and violence in sport as instances of pain-based entertainment.

== See also ==
	Topics related to suffering
Physical pain-related topics	Pain · Pain (philosophy) · Psychogenic pain · Chronic pain · Dehydration · Hunger Starvation · Terminal dehydration · Pain in animals (Amphibians, Cephalopods, Crustaceans, Fish, Invertebrates)
Ethics-related topics	Evil · Problem of evil · Hell · Good and evil: welfarist theories · Negative consequentialism · Suffering-focused ethics
Compassion-related topics	Compassion · Compassion fatigue · Pity · Mercy · Sympathy · Empathy
Cruelty-related topics	Cruelty · Schadenfreude · Sadistic personality disorder · Abuse · Physical abuse · Psychological or emotional abuse · Self-harm · Cruelty to animals
Death-related topics	Euthanasia · Animal euthanasia · Suicide
Other related topics	Eradication of suffering · Dukkha · Weltschmerz · Negative affectivity · Psychological pain · Amor fati · Victimology · Penology · Pleasure · Pain and pleasure · Happiness · Hedonic treadmill · Suffering risks · Wild animal suffering · Retributive justice

== Bibliography ==
- Joseph A. Amato. Victims and Values: A History and a Theory of Suffering. New York: Praeger, 1990. ISBN 0-275-93690-2
- Florian G. Calian. Religion and the Problem of Evil. Review of Ecumenical Studies, Paradigm, 2024. ISSN: 2359-8093
- James Davies. The Importance of Suffering: the value and meaning of emotional discontent. London: Routledge ISBN 0-415-66780-1
- Casell, E. J. (1991). The nature of suffering and the goals of medicine (pertama ed.). New York: Oxford University Press.
- Cynthia Halpern. Suffering, Politics, Power: a Genealogy in Modern Political Theory. Albany: State University of New York Press, 2002. ISBN 0-7914-5103-8
- Jamie Mayerfeld. Suffering and Moral Responsibility. New York: Oxford University Press, 2005. ISBN 0-19-515495-9
- Thomas Metzinger. Suffering.In Kurt Almqvist & Anders Haag (2017)[eds.], The Return of Consciousness. Stockholm: Axel and Margaret Ax:son Johnson Foundation. ISBN 978-91-89672-90-1
- David B. Morris. The Culture of Pain. Berkeley: University of California, 2002. ISBN 0-520-08276-1
- Elaine Scarry. The Body in Pain: The Making and Unmaking of the World. New York: Oxford University Press, 1987. ISBN 0-19-504996-9
- Spelman, E. V. (1995). Fruits of sorrow framing our attention to suffering. Boston, Mass., USA: Beacon Press.
- Ronald Anderson. World Suffering and Quality of Life, Social Indicators Research Series, Volume 56, 2015. ISBN 978-94-017-9669-9; Also: Human Suffering and Quality of Life, SpringerBriefs in Well-Being and Quality of Life Research, 2014. ISBN 978-94-007-7668-5
