= Pain in amphibians =

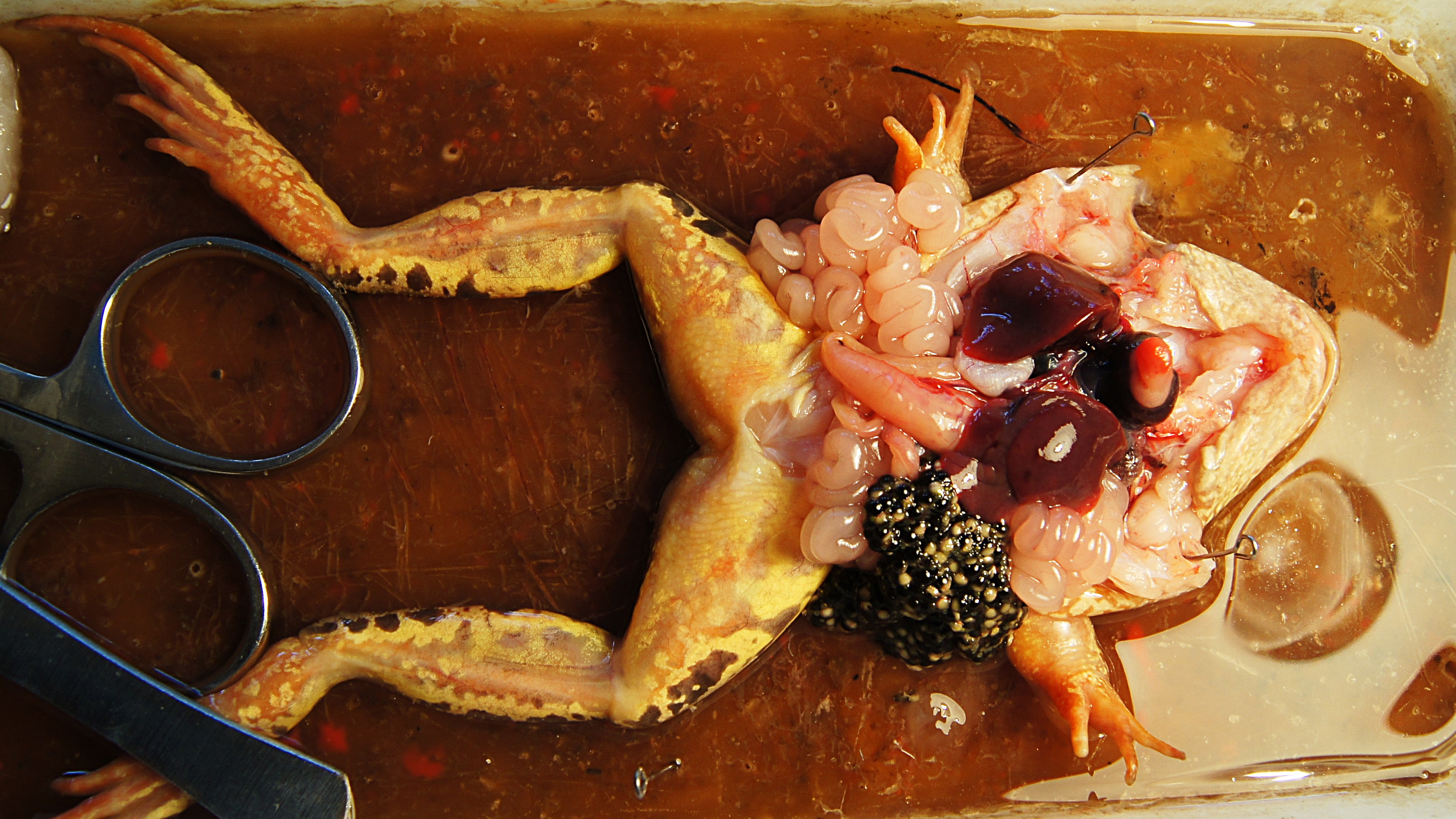
Dissection of a frog

Pain is an aversive sensation and feeling associated with actual, or potential, tissue damage. It is widely accepted by a broad spectrum of scientists and philosophers that non-human animals can perceive pain, including pain in amphibians.

Pain is a complex mental state, with a distinct perceptual quality but also associated with suffering, which is an emotional state. Because of this complexity, the presence of pain in non-human animals cannot be determined unambiguously using observational methods, but the conclusion that animals experience pain is often inferred on the basis of likely presence of phenomenal consciousness, which is deduced from comparative brain physiology as well as physical and behavioural reactions.

Amphibians, particularly anurans, fulfill several physiological and behavioural criteria proposed as indicating that non-human animals may experience pain. These fulfilled criteria include a suitable nervous system and sensory receptors, opioid receptors and reduced responses to noxious stimuli when given analgesics and local anaesthetics, physiological changes to noxious stimuli, displaying protective motor reactions, exhibiting avoidance learning and making trade-offs between noxious stimulus avoidance and other motivational requirements.

Pain in amphibians has societal implications including their exposure to pollutants, (preparation for) cuisine (e.g. frog legs) and amphibians used in scientific research.

Several scientists and scientific groups have expressed the belief that amphibians can feel pain, however, this remains somewhat controversial due to differences in brain structure and the nervous system compared with other vertebrates.

Examples of the three modern orders of amphibians

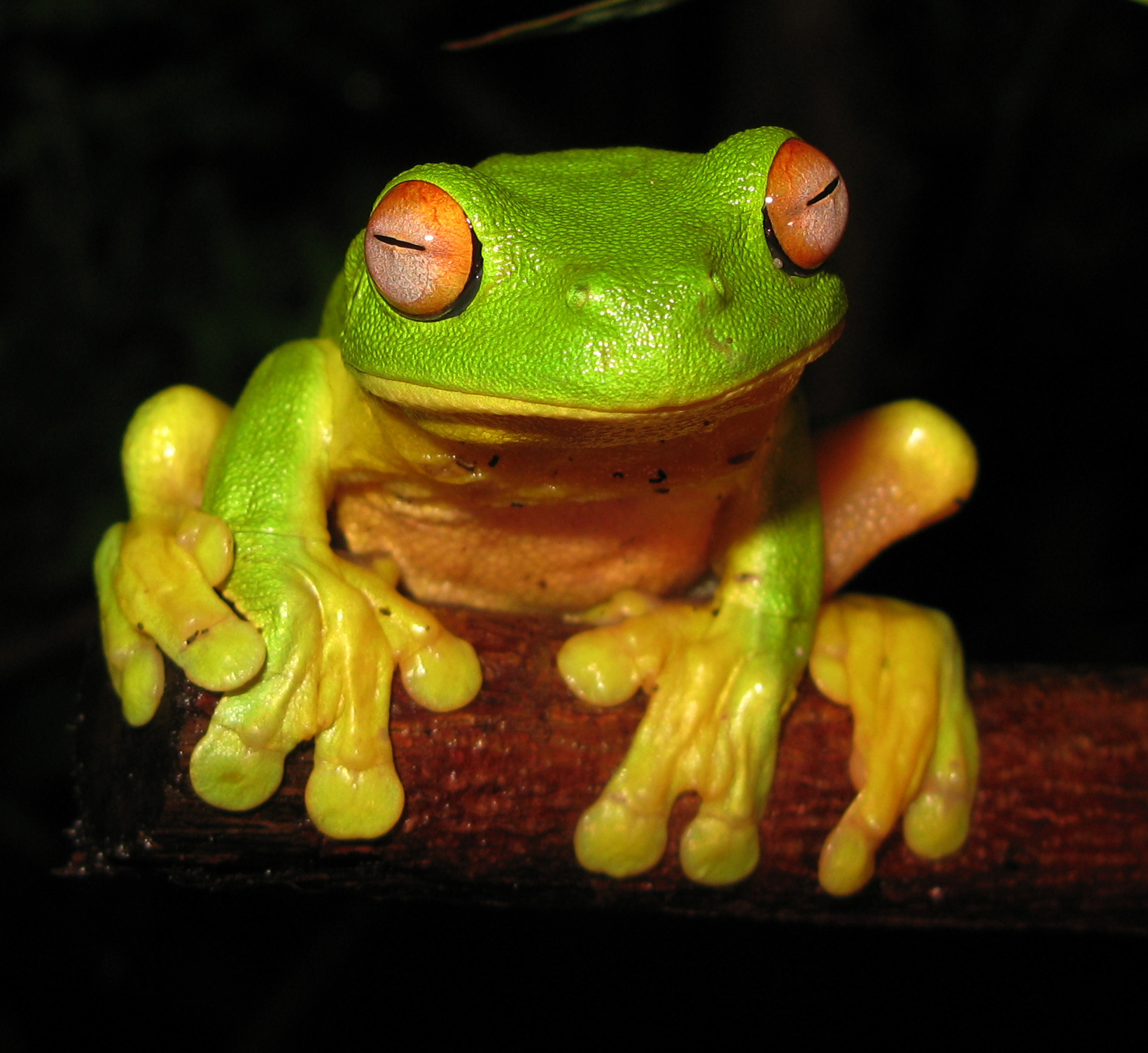
Orange-eyed tree frog – (Anura)

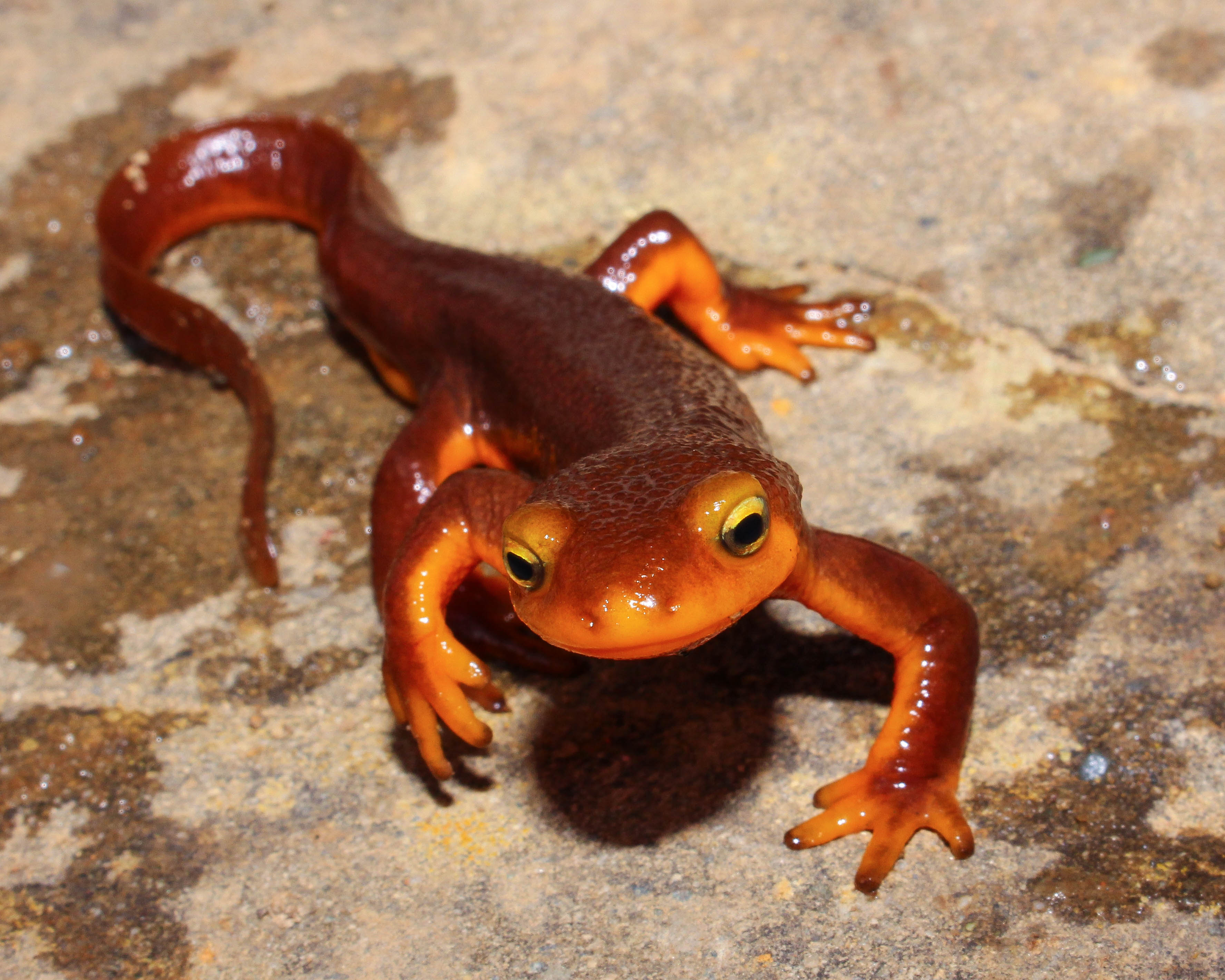
California newt – (Urodela)

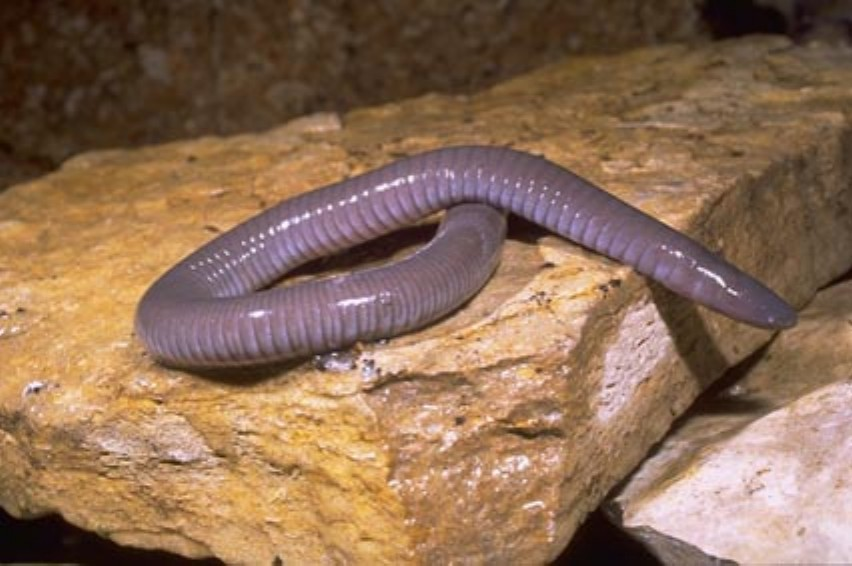
Mexican burrowing caecilian – (Apoda)

== Background ==
The possibility that amphibians and other non-human animals may experience pain has a long history. Initially, pain in non-human animals was based around theoretical and philosophical argument, but more recently has turned to scientific investigation.

=== Philosophy ===
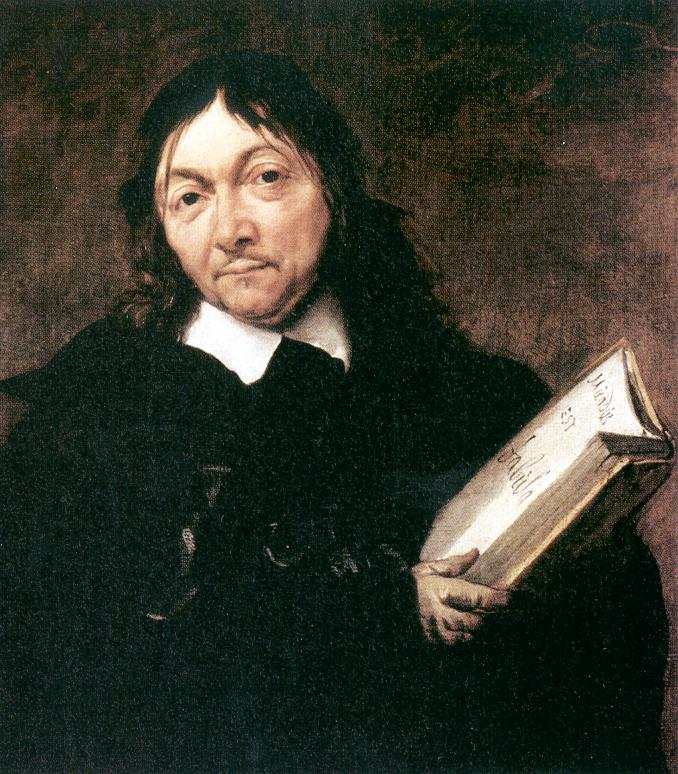
René Descartes

The idea that non-human animals might not feel pain goes back to the 17th-century French philosopher, René Descartes, who argued that animals do not experience pain and suffering because they lack consciousness. In 1789, the British philosopher and social reformist, Jeremy Bentham, addressed in his book An Introduction to the Principles of Morals and Legislation the issue of our treatment of animals with the following often quoted words: "The question is not, Can they reason? nor, can they talk? but, Can they suffer?"

Peter Singer, a bioethicist and author of Animal Liberation published in 1975, suggested that consciousness is not necessarily the key issue: just because animals have smaller brains, or are 'less conscious', this does not mean that they are not capable of feeling pain.

Bernard Rollin, the principal author of two U.S. federal laws regulating pain relief for animals, writes that researchers remained unsure into the 1980s as to whether animals experience pain. In his interactions with scientists and other veterinarians, Rollin was regularly asked to "prove" that animals are conscious, and to provide "scientifically acceptable" grounds for claiming that they feel pain.

Continuing into the 1990s, discussions were further developed on the roles that philosophy and science had in understanding animal cognition and mentality. In subsequent years, it was argued there was strong support for the suggestion that some animals (most likely amniotes) have at least simple conscious thoughts and feelings and that the view animals feel pain differently to higher primates is now a minority view.

=== Scientific investigation ===
Cambridge Declaration on Consciousness (2012)

The absence of a neocortex does not appear to preclude an organism from experiencing affective states. Convergent evidence indicates that non-human animals have the neuroanatomical, neurochemical, and neurophysiological substrates of conscious states along with the capacity to exhibit intentional behaviors. Consequently, the weight of evidence indicates that humans are not unique in possessing the neurological substrates that generate consciousness. Non-human animals, including all mammals and birds, and many other creatures, including octopuses, also possess these neurological substrates.

In the 20th- and 21st-century, there were many scientific investigations of pain in non-human animals.

==== Mammals ====
At the turn of the century, studies were published showing that arthritic rats self-select analgesic opiates. In 2014, the veterinary Journal of Small Animal Practice published an article on the recognition of pain which started "The ability to experience pain is universally shared by all mammals...", and in 2015, it was reported in the science journal Pain that several mammalian species (rat, mouse, rabbit, cat and horse) adopt a facial expression in response to a noxious stimulus that is consistent with the expression of pain.

==== Birds ====
At the same time as the investigations using arthritic rats, studies were published showing that birds with gait abnormalities self-select for a diet that contains carprofen, an analgesic. In 2005, it was written "Avian pain is likely analogous to pain experienced by most mammals" and in 2014, "...it is accepted that birds perceive and respond to noxious stimuli and that birds feel pain."

==== Reptiles ====
Veterinary articles have been published stating reptiles experience pain in a way analogous to mammals, and that analgesics are effective in this class of vertebrates.

==== Fish ====
Several scientists or scientific groups have made statements indicating they believe fish can experience pain. For example, in 2004, Chandroo et al. wrote "Anatomical, pharmacological and behavioural data suggest that affective states of pain, fear and stress are likely to be experienced by fish in similar ways as in tetrapods". In 2009, the European Food Safety Authority published a document stating scientific opinion on the welfare of fish. The document contains many sections indicating that the scientific panel believe fish can experience pain, for example, "Fish that are simply immobilized or paralysed [before euthanasia] would experience pain and suffering..." In 2015, Brown wrote "A review of the evidence for pain perception strongly suggests that fish experience pain in a manner similar to the rest of the vertebrates."

==== Argument by analogy ====
In 2012 the American philosopher Gary Varner reviewed the research literature on pain in animals. His findings are summarised in the following table.

Argument by analogy
Property
Property	Fish	Amphibians	Reptiles	Birds	Mammals
Has nociceptors	✓	✓	✓	✓	✓
Has brain	✓	✓	✓	✓	✓
Nociceptors and brain linked	✓	? (Note: But see) / ✓	? (Note: But see) / ✓	? / ✓	✓
Has endogenous opioids	✓	✓	✓	✓	✓
Analgesics affect responses	✓	? (Note: But see)	? (Note: But see)	✓	✓
Response to damaging stimuli similar to humans	✓	✓	✓	✓	✓

=== Notes ===
Arguing by analogy, Varner claims that any animal which exhibits the properties listed in the table could be said to experience pain. On that basis, he concludes that all vertebrates, including amphibians, probably experience pain, but invertebrates apart from cephalopods probably do not experience pain.

== Experiencing pain ==
Although there are numerous definitions of pain, almost all involve two key components.

First, nociception is required. This is the ability to detect noxious stimuli which evoke a reflex response that rapidly moves the entire animal, or the affected part of its body, away from the source of the stimulus. The concept of nociception does not imply any adverse, subjective "feeling" – it is a reflex action. An example would be the rapid withdrawal of a finger that has touched something hot – the withdrawal occurs before any sensation of pain is actually experienced.

The second component is the experience of "pain" itself, or suffering – the internal, emotional interpretation of the nociceptive experience. This is when the withdrawn finger begins to hurt, moments after the withdrawal. Pain is therefore a private, emotional experience. Pain cannot be directly measured in other animals; responses to putatively painful stimuli can be measured, but not the experience itself. To address this problem when assessing the capacity of other species to experience pain, argument-by-analogy is used. This is based on the principle that if an animal responds to a stimulus in a similar way, it is likely to have had an analogous experience.

=== Nociception ===
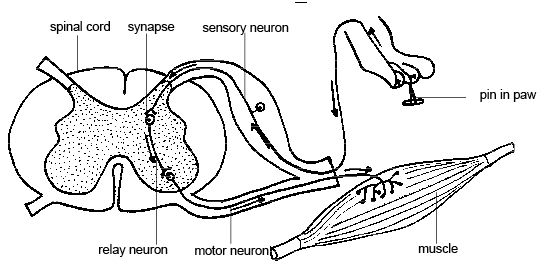
Nociception: The reflex arc of a dog with a pin in her paw. Note there is no communication to the brain, but the paw is withdrawn by nervous impulses generated by the spinal cord. There is no conscious interpretation of the stimulus by the dog.

Nociception usually involves the transmission of a signal along a chain of nerve fibers from the site of a noxious stimulus at the periphery to the spinal cord and brain. This process evokes a reflex arc response generated at the spinal cord and not involving the brain, such as flinching or withdrawal of a limb. Nociception is found, in one form or another, across all major animal taxa. Nociception can be observed using modern imaging techniques; and a physiological and behavioral response to nociception can be detected.

=== Emotional pain ===
Sometimes a distinction is made between "physical pain" and "emotional" or "psychological pain". Emotional pain is the pain experienced in the absence of physical trauma, e.g. the pain experienced after the loss of a loved one, or the break-up of a relationship. It has been argued that only primates can feel "emotional pain", because they are the only animals that have a neocortex – a part of the brain's cortex considered to be the "thinking area". However, research has provided evidence that monkeys, dogs, cats and birds can show signs of emotional pain and display behaviours associated with depression during painful experience, i.e. lack of motivation, lethargy, anorexia, unresponsiveness to other animals.

=== Physical pain ===
The nerve impulses of the nociception response may be conducted to the brain thereby registering the location, intensity, quality and unpleasantness of the stimulus. This subjective component of pain involves conscious awareness of both the sensation and the unpleasantness (the aversive, negative affect). The brain processes underlying conscious awareness of the unpleasantness (suffering), are not well understood.

There have been several published lists of criteria for establishing whether non-human animals experience pain, e.g. Some criteria that may indicate the potential of another species, including amphibians, to feel pain include:

1. Has a suitable nervous system and sensory receptors
2. Has opioid receptors and shows reduced responses to noxious stimuli when given analgesics and local anaesthetics
3. Physiological changes to noxious stimuli
4. Displays protective motor reactions that might include reduced use of an affected area such as limping, rubbing, holding or autotomy
5. Shows avoidance learning
6. Shows trade-offs between noxious stimulus avoidance and other motivational requirements
7. High cognitive ability and sentience

== Adaptive value ==
The adaptive value of nociception is obvious; an organism detecting a noxious stimulus immediately withdraws the limb, appendage or entire body from the noxious stimulus and thereby avoids further (potential) injury. However, a characteristic of pain (in mammals at least) is that pain can result in hyperalgesia (a heightened sensitivity to noxious stimuli) and allodynia (a heightened sensitivity to non-noxious stimuli). When this heightened sensitisation occurs, the adaptive value is less clear. First, the pain arising from the heightened sensitisation can be disproportionate to the actual tissue damage caused. Second, the heightened sensitisation may also become chronic, persisting well beyond the tissues healing. This can mean that rather than the actual tissue damage causing pain, it is the pain due to the heightened sensitisation that becomes the concern. This means the sensitisation process is sometimes termed maladaptive. It is often suggested hyperalgesia and allodynia assist organisms to protect themselves during healing, but experimental evidence to support this has been lacking.

In 2014, the adaptive value of sensitisation due to injury was tested using the predatory interactions between longfin inshore squid (Doryteuthis pealeii) and black sea bass (Centropristis striata) which are natural predators of this squid. If injured squid are targeted by a bass, they began their defensive behaviours sooner (indicated by greater alert distances and longer flight initiation distances) than uninjured squid. If anaesthetic (1% ethanol and MgCl_{2}) is administered prior to the injury, this prevents the sensitisation and blocks the behavioural effect. The authors claim this study is the first experimental evidence to support the argument that nociceptive sensitisation is actually an adaptive response to injuries.

== Research findings ==
=== Nervous system ===
==== Receptors ====
Frogs have nociceptors in the superficial and deep layers of the skin that transduce mechanical and chemical noxious stimuli. Furthermore, frogs possess neural pathways that support processing and perception of noxious stimuli. Although organization is less well structured compared with mammals, it is now commonly accepted that amphibians possess neuro-anatomical pathways conductive of a complete nociceptive experience.

==== Nerve fibres ====
Early electrophysiological studies in frogs report that noxious mechanical, thermal and chemical stimuli excite primary afferent fibres with slowly conducting axons.

There are two types of nerve fibre relevant to pain in amphibians. Group C nerve fibres are a type of sensory nerve fibre which lack a myelin sheath and have a small diameter, meaning they have a low nerve conduction velocity. The suffering associated with burns, toothaches, or crushing injury are caused by C fibre activity. A-delta fibres are another type of sensory nerve fibre, however, these are myelinated and therefore transmit impulses faster than non-myelinated C fibres. A-delta fibres carry cold, pressure and some pain signals, and are associated with acute pain that results in "pulling away" from noxious stimuli.

The skin of frogs contains both Group C fibres and A-delta fibres.

==== Brain ====
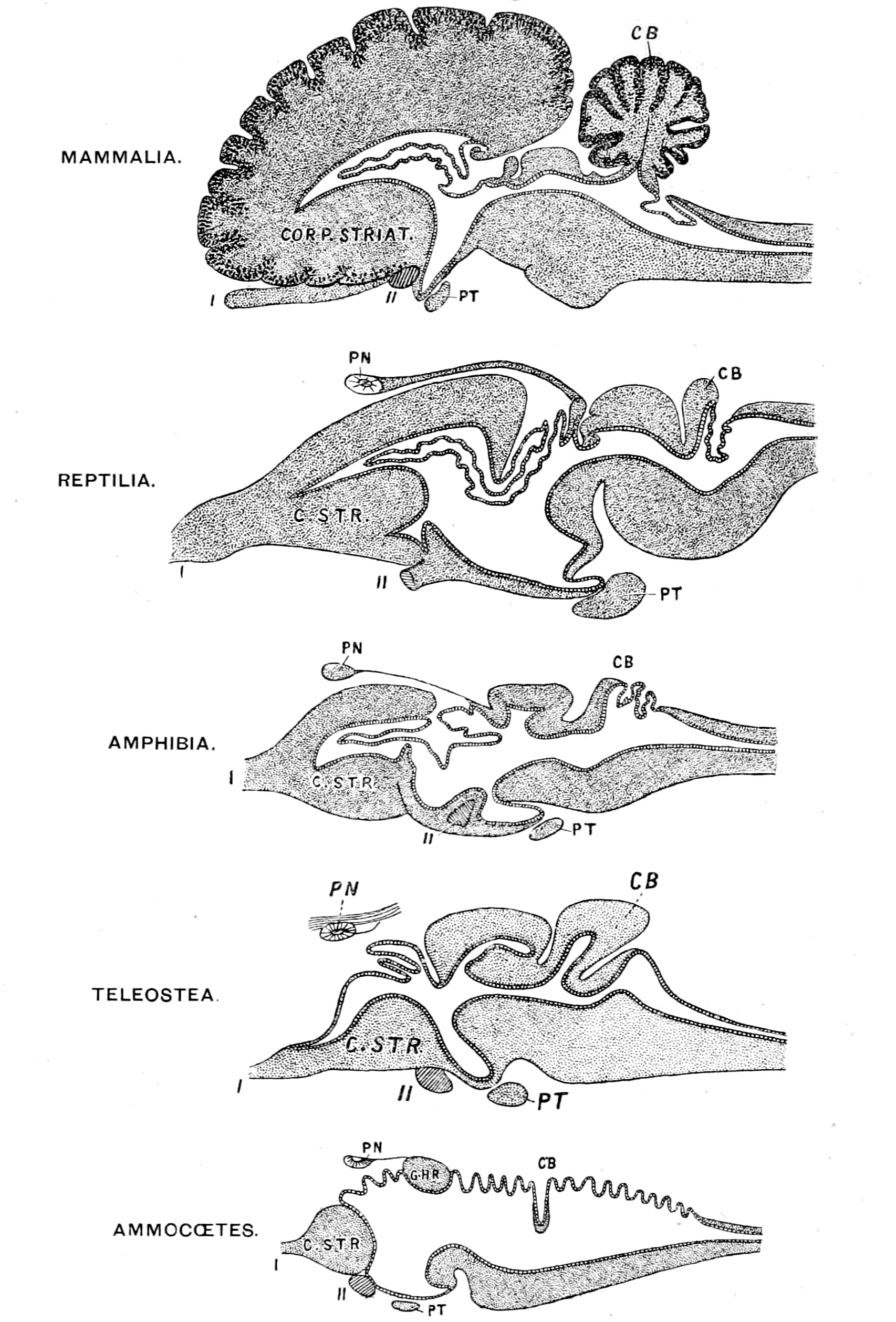
Brains of vertebrate classes. CB., cerebellum; PT., pituitary body; PN., pineal body; C. STR., corpus striatum; G.H.R., right ganglion habenulæ. I., olfactory; II., optic nerves.

All vertebrate species have a common brain archetype divided into the telencephalon and diencephalon (collectively referred to as forebrain), mesencephalon (midbrain) and rhombencephalon (hindbrain). Nervous connections to the telencephalon indicate that frogs may be able to perceive pain.

In 2002, James Rose, from the University of Wyoming, published reviews arguing that fish cannot feel pain because they lack a neocortex in the brain. If the presence of a large, considerably developed neocortex is required for experiencing pain, as Rose suggests, this theory would eliminate birds, amphibians, other non-mammalian animals, and even some mammals from having the capacity to experience pain. Other researchers do not believe that animal consciousness requires a neocortex, but can arise from homologous subcortical brain networks. Animal behaviouralist Temple Grandin argues that fish (and therefore, presumably, amphibians) could still have consciousness without a neocortex because "different species can use different brain structures and systems to handle the same functions."

=== Opioid system and effects of analgesics ===
By spinal administration of a range of opioid agonists, it has been demonstrated that frogs have mu (μ)-, delta (δ) and kappa (κ)-opioid binding sites. The kappa sub-types κ_{1} and κ_{2} are present in the brains of edible frogs (Rana esculenta). In evolutionary terms, this means the opioid receptor sub-types are already present in amphibians, although the differences between these are less pronounced than in mammals. Sequence comparisons show that the amphibian opioid receptors are highly conserved (70-84% similar to mammals) and are expressed in the central nervous system (CNS) areas apparently involved in pain experience.

When treating amphibians, veterinary practice frequently uses the same analgesics and anesthetics used for mammals. These chemicals act on the nociceptive pathways, blocking signals to the brain where emotional responses to the signals are further processed by certain parts of the brain found in amniotes ("higher vertebrates").

==== Effects of morphine and other opioids ====
The relative analgesic potency of 11 opioid agents (μ-opioid receptor agonists – fentanyl, levorphanol, methadone, morphine, meperidine and codeine; the partial μ agonist – buprenorphine; and the κ-opioid receptor agonists – nalorphine, bremazocine, U50488 and CI-977) in the Northern grass frog produced a dose-dependent and long-lasting analgesia which persists for at least four hours. The relative analgesic potency of μ-opioids in amphibians was correlated with the relative analgesic potency of these same agents recorded in on the mouse writhing and hot plate tests. Other opioid analgesics are effective in amphibians, for example, butorphanol.

Alfaxalone–butorphanol and alfaxalone–morphine combinations are comparable in terms of onset and duration of anaesthesia in Oriental fire-bellied toads (Bombina orientalis).

When an isolated peptide termed "frog's nociception-related peptide" (fNRP) is injected into newts, it increases the latency for newts to flick their tails in response to a hot-beam. The effect is blocked by simultaneous injection of naloxone, thereby indicating evidence for the interaction of fNRP and opioid steps in the analgesia pathways of newts.

==== Effects of opioid antagonists ====
Naloxone and naltrexone are both μ-opioid receptor antagonists which, in mammals, negate the analgesic effects of opioids. Morphine analgesia in frogs is blocked by both naloxone and naltrexone, indicating that the effect is mediated at least partially by opioid receptors.

==== Effects of other analgesics ====
Direct intraspinal injection of the catecholamines epinephrine and norepinephrine, and the α-adrenergic agents dexmedetomidine and clonidine, produce a dose-dependent elevation of pain thresholds in the Northern leopard frog (Rana pipiens). This analgesia occurs without accompanying motor or sedative effects.

A range of non-opioid drugs administered through the dorsal lymph sac of Northern leopard frogs has demonstrable analgesic effects, established by using the acetic acid test. Chlorpromazine and haloperidol (antipsychotics), chlordiazepoxide (a benzodiazepine) and diphenhydramine (a histamine antagonist) produced moderate to strong analgesic effects, whereas indomethacin and ketorolac (NSAIDs), and pentobarbital (a barbiturate) produced weaker analgesic effects.

=== Physiological changes ===
In multiple animal studies, it has been shown that stress causes increases in glucocorticoid levels). Frogs release corticosteroids in response to many environmental factors and this pattern of release is often species-specific within Amphibia More specifically, increased stocking density and hypoxia cause changes in cortisol (one of the glucocorticoids) and white blood cells in American bullfrog tadpoles (Lithobates catesbeianus) indicative of stress.

Analgesia in amphibians can be measured using heart rate and respiratory rate.

=== Protective motor responses ===
Amphibians exhibit classic wiping and withdrawal protective motor responses to noxious chemical, heat and mechanical stimuli.

Acetic acid (a strong irritant) applied to the hindlimb of frogs elicits vigorous wiping of the exposed skin; both pH and osmolarity may contribute to the nociception produced. This response is used in a standard test for analgesic effects in frogs, commonly termed the "acetic acid test". In this procedure, dilutions of the acid are placed drop-wise on the dorsum of the frog's thigh until the frog wipes the affected area.

Newts flick their tails in response to it being irradiated by a hot beam, in a very similar manner to that observed in rodents being used in the tail flick test.

The threshold to Von Frey hairs and response to nociceptive withdrawal can be used to measure the effectiveness of analgesia.

=== Avoidance learning ===
Early studies showed that African clawed frogs (Xenopus laevis) learn to avoid electric shocks in an aquatic shuttle-box test and similarly, cane toads (Bufo marinus) learn to avoid electric shocks in a T-maze. Furthermore, American bullfrogs (Rana catesbiana) learn to inhibit their high-priority, biologically adaptive righting reflex to avoid electric shock; after training, they remain passively on their backs rather than exhibiting the normal short-latency, righting response.

Batrachochytrium dendrobatidis is a chytrid fungus that causes the disease chytridiomycosis in amphibians; frogs learn to avoid the fungus after just one exposure.

=== Trade-offs in motivation ===
A painful experience may change the motivation for normal behavioural responses. American bullfrogs learn to inhibit their high-priority, biologically adaptive righting reflex to avoid electric shock. After repeated exposure, they remain passively on their backs rather than exhibiting the normal, short-latency, righting response, thereby showing a trade-off in motivation.

=== Cognitive ability and sentience ===
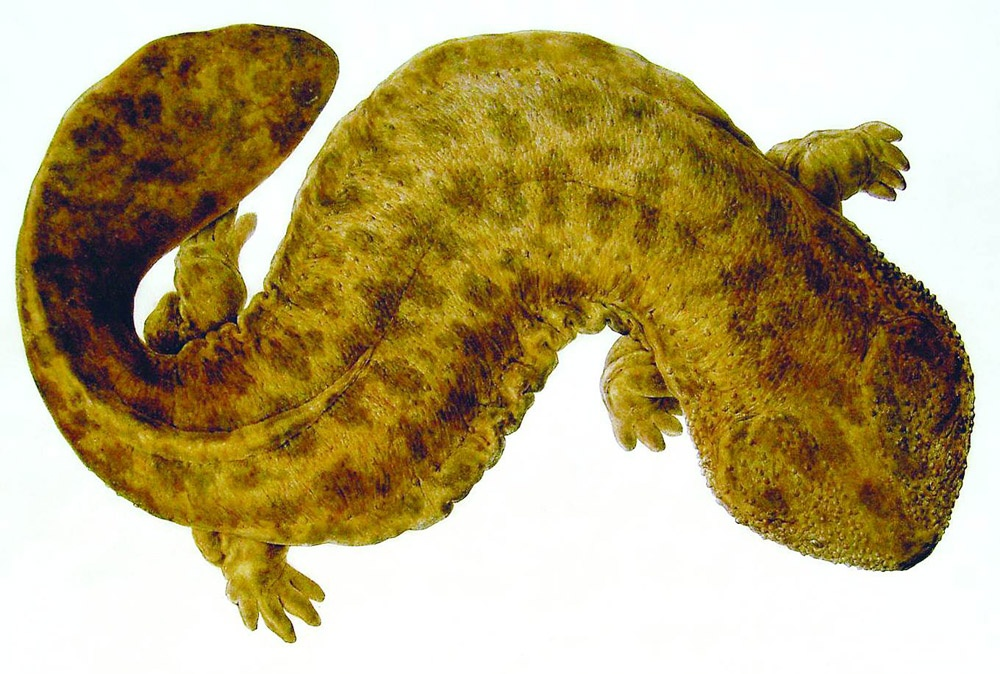
Giant salamander

It has been argued that although a high cognitive capacity may indicate a greater likelihood of experiencing pain, it also gives these animals a greater ability to deal with this, leaving animals with a lower cognitive ability a greater problem in coping with pain.

==== Habituation ====
Habituation is one of the simplest forms of animal learning. It has been stated there are no qualitative or quantitative differences between vertebrate species in this form of learning indicating there is no difference between mammals and amphibians in this process.

==== Associative learning ====
Newts are capable of associative learning. They are able to associate chemical signals from a novel predator with another chemical stimulus when the second stimulus is the skin extract of another newt.

==== Numeracy ====
At least some amphibians are capable of numeracy. When offered live fruit flies (Drosophila virilis), salamanders choose the larger of 1 vs 2 and 2 vs 3. Frogs are able to distinguish between low numbers (1 vs 2, 2 vs 3, but not 3 vs 4) and large numbers (3 vs 6, 4 vs 8, but not 4 vs 6) of prey. This is irrespective of other characteristics, i.e. surface area, volume, weight and movement, although discrimination among large numbers may be based on surface area.

==== Spatial orientation ====
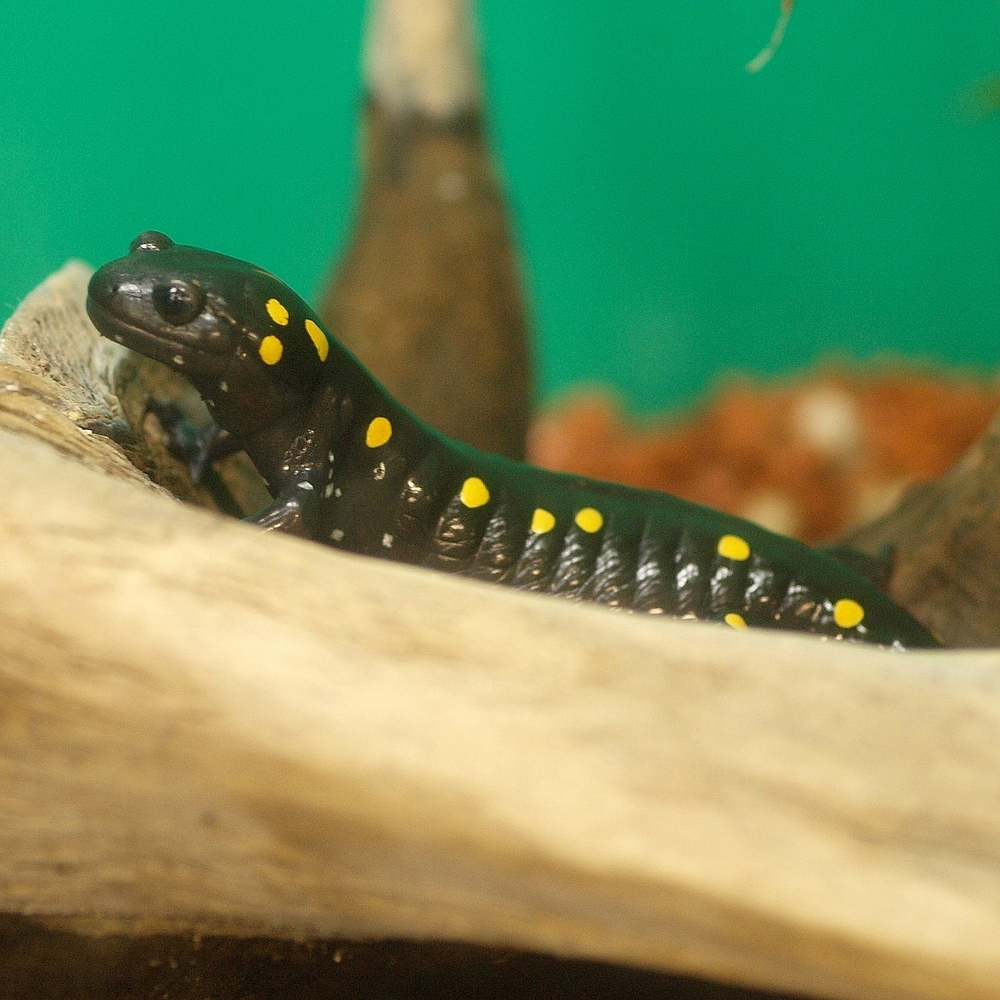
The spotted salamander can learn to use visual cues to locate rewards.

The Rocky Mountain toad (Bufo woodhousii woodhousii) and Gulf Coast toad (Bufo valliceps) are able to discriminate between left and right positions in a T-maze.

Both the terrestrial toad Rhinella arenarum and the spotted salamander (Ambystoma maculatum) can learn to orient in an open space using visual cues to get to a reward. Furthermore, they prefer using cues close to the reward. This shows a learning phenomenon previously recorded in other taxa including mammals, birds, fish and invertebrates. It has been suggested that male dart frogs of the species Allobates femoralis use spatial learning for way-finding in their local area; they are able to find their way back to their territory when displaced several hundred metres, so long as they are displaced in their local area.

==== Social learning ====
Wood frog (Rana sylvatica) tadpoles use social learning to acquire information about predators; the ratio of tutors to observers, but not group size, influences the intensity of learned predator recognition. Wood frog tadpoles also exhibit local enhancement in their social learning, however, spotted salamander larvae do not; this difference in social learning could be largely due to differences in aquatic ecology between tadpoles and salamander larvae.

== Criteria for pain perception ==
Scientists have also proposed that in conjunction with argument-by-analogy, criteria of physiology or behavioural responses can be used to assess the possibility of non-human animals perceiving pain. The following is a table of criteria suggested by Sneddon et al.

Criteria for pain perception in amphibians
Criteria
Criteria	Anura	Caudata	Gymnophiona
Has nociceptors	✓	?	?
Pathways to central nervous system	✓	?	?
Central processing in brain	✓	?	?
Receptors for analgesic drugs	✓	?	?
Physiological responses	✓	?	?
Movement away from noxious stimuli	✓	?	?
Behavioural changes from norm	✓	?	?
Protective behaviour	✓	?	?
Responses reduced by analgesic drugs	✓	?	?
Self-administration of analgesia	?	?	?
Responses with high priority over other stimuli	✓	?	?
Pay cost to access analgesia	?	?	?
Altered behavioural choices/preferences	✓	?	?
Relief learning	?	?	?
Rubbing, limping or guarding	✓	?	?
Paying a cost to avoid noxious stimulus	?	?	?
Tradeoffs with other requirements	✓	?	?

== Scientific statements ==
Several scientists have made statements indicating they believe amphibians can experience pain. For example, -

After examining the morphology of the nervous system of vertebrates, Somme concluded "...most four-legged vertebrates have some state of consciousness..."

Gentz, in a paper on the surgery of amphibians, writes "Postoperative recommendations include ...analgesia" and "Hypothermia is also unacceptable as a sedation technique for painful procedures".

Veterinary articles have been published stating amphibians experience pain in a way analogous to mammals, and that analgesics are effective in control of this class of vertebrates. Shine et al., wrote that most animal ethics committees and the wider community believe that amphibians can feel pain.

Some scientists have been a little more guarded about the experience of amphibians, for example, Michaels et al. wrote that the identification of pain pathways shared between amphibians and other amniotes suggests an ability to experience pain, even if in a different and more restricted sense than in amniote taxa.

== Societal implications ==
Societal implications of pain in amphibians include acute and chronic exposure to pollutants, cuisine and scientific research (e.g. genetic-modification may have detrimental effects on welfare, deliberately-imposed adverse physical, physiological and behavioural states, toe-clipping or other methods of invasive marking and handling procedures which may cause injury).

=== Culinary ===
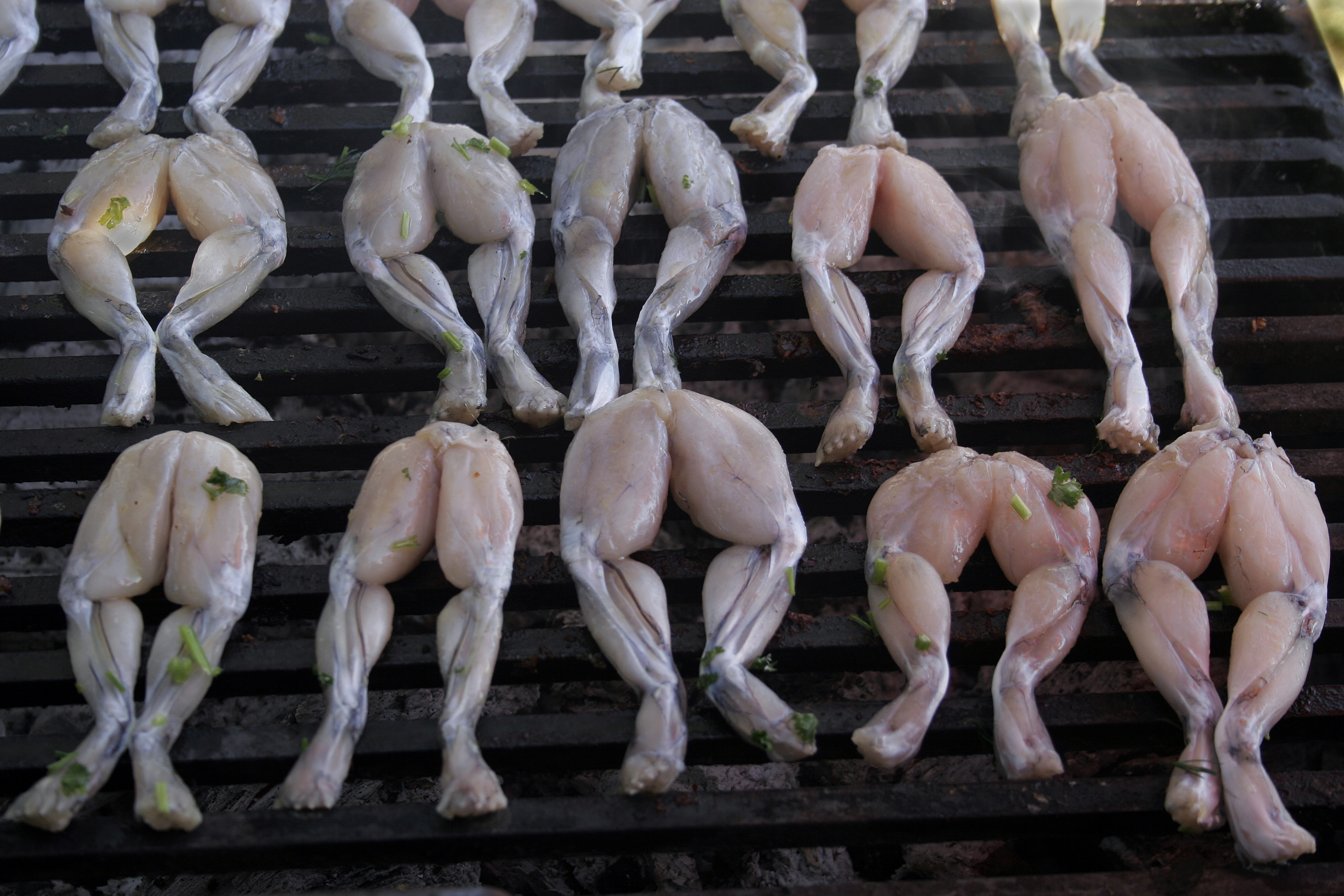
Frogs legs – a culinary dish

It has been claimed that frogs killed for eating are "...sliced through the belly while they are still fully conscious and they can take up to an hour to die."

=== Legislation ===
In the UK, the legislation protecting animals during scientific research, the Animals (Scientific Procedures) Act 1986, protects amphibians from the moment they become capable of independent feeding. The legislation protecting animals in most other circumstances in the UK is the Animal Welfare Act 2006, which states that in the Act, "'animal means a vertebrate other than man", thereby including amphibians.The Animal Welfare (Sentience) Act 2022 includes all vertebrates under its definition of sentience.

The 1974 Norwegian Animal Rights Law states it relates to mammals, birds, frogs, salamanders, reptiles, fish, and crustaceans.

In the US, the legislation protecting animals during scientific research is the Animal Welfare Act. This Act excludes protection of "cold-blooded" animals, thereby excluding amphibians from protection.

== See also ==
- Animal cognition
- Animal consciousness
- Animal cruelty
- Ethics of eating meat
- Ethics of uncertain sentience
- Moral status of animals in the ancient world
- Pain and suffering in laboratory animals
- Sentience
- N-Acylethanolamine
