= Eric Cassell =

American physician and bioethicist (1928–2021)

- Cassell in 2013
- Born: Eric Jonothan Goldstein; August 29, 1928; New York City, New York, U.S.
- Died: September 24, 2021 (aged 93); East Stroudsburg, Pennsylvania, U.S.
- Known for: Work on the nature of suffering and the role of empathy in the medical profession
- Notable work: The Nature of Suffering and the Goals of Medicine (1991)
- Children: 1
- Website: ericcassell.com

Eric Jonathan Cassell, born Eric Jonathan Goldstein (August 29, 1928 – September 24, 2021) was an American physician and bioethicist.

== Early life and education ==
Eric Jonathan Goldstein was born on August 29, 1928, in New York City. He and his brother changed their surname to Cassell to render it closer to their grandfather's name, which was changed at Ellis Island. He received a BS from Queens College, City University of New York, in 1950, an MA from Columbia University, also in 1950, and an MD from New York University School of Medicine in 1954.

== Career ==
Cassell taught at Cornell University Medical College and Mount Sinai School of Medicine, and practiced at French Hospital and New York Hospital. He was elected a member of the National Academy of Medicine in 1982.

According to a 2019 critical review of Cassell's work, his views on the nature of suffering were "close to canonical" in the medical community. Cassell advanced a subjective view of suffering, according to which the condition must be understood by reference to the beliefs and perceptions of the person experiencing it.

In 2001, Cassell published a study in Annals of Internal Medicine that assessed the decision-making capacity of severely ill adults, finding that their decision-making abilities were similar to those of children under 10. Commenting on his findings, Cassell stated, "I think it's grossly unfair and I actually think it's an abuse of a patient to put someone in a position to make decisions when they don't have the capacity to make them."

Cassell died on September 24, 2021, in East Stroudsburg, Pennsylvania.

== Bibliography ==
- Cassell, Eric J. (1976). The Healer's Art: A New Approach to the Doctor-Patient Relationship. Philadelphia: Lippincott. ISBN 0-397-01098-2. OCLC 1958247.
- Cassell, Eric J. (July 24, 1997). Doctoring: The Nature of Primary Care Medicine. Oxford University Press. doi:10.1093/acprof:oso/9780195113235.001.0001. ISBN 978-0-19-511323-5.
- Cassell, Eric J. (April 8, 2004) [1991]. The Nature of Suffering and the Goals of Medicine. Oxford University Press. doi:10.1093/acprof:oso/9780195156164.001.0001. ISBN 978-0-19-515616-4.
- Cassell, Eric J. (December 5, 2012). The Nature of Healing: The Modern Practice of Medicine. Oxford University Press. doi:10.1093/acprof:oso/9780195369052.001.0001. ISBN 978-0-19-536905-2.
