= Antifrustrationism =

Axiological position which prioritizes avoiding preference frustration

Antifrustrationism is an axiological position proposed by German philosopher Christoph Fehige, which states that "we don't do any good by creating satisfied extra preferences. What matters about preferences is not that they have a satisfied existence, but that they don't have a frustrated existence." According to Fehige, "maximizers of preference satisfaction should instead call themselves minimizers of preference frustration."

What makes the world better is "not its amount of preference satisfaction, but the avoided preference frustration." In the words of Fehige, "we have obligations to make preferrers satisfied, but no obligations to make satisfied preferrers." The position stands in contrast to classical utilitarianism, among other ethical theories, which holds that creating "satisfied preferrers" is, or can be, a good in itself. Antifrustrationism has similarities with, although it is different from, negative utilitarianism, the teachings of Buddha, Stoicism, philosophical pessimism, and Schopenhauer's philosophy. In particular, negative preference utilitarianism states that we should act in such a way that the number of frustrated preferences is minimized and is therefore directly based on antifrustrationism. The difference is that antifrustrationism is an axiology, whereas negative preference utilitarianism is an ethical theory.

== See also ==
- Antinatalism
- The Asymmetry (population ethics)
- Buddhist ethics
- Frustration
- Negative utilitarianism
- Painism
- Pessimism
- Stoicism
- Suffering-focused ethics
