= Eradication of suffering =

Biotechnological elimination of involuntary suffering

The eradication of suffering or abolition of suffering is a proposed goal in biotechnology and ethics to prevent or eliminate involuntary pain and suffering in sentient beings. The idea is associated with some forms of transhumanism, utilitarianism, bioethics and animal welfare ethics. Supporters have proposed the use of methods such as genetic engineering, neuroscience, pharmacology and genome editing to reduce or prevent negative experiences.

== Biology and medicine ==
The development of modern anaesthesia in the 19th century made it possible to prevent pain during surgery, although some practitioners initially opposed its use because they regarded pain as a natural response to injury. Later proposals to alter or remove pain have raised related questions about pain's protective functions.

People who are naturally unable to feel pain or unpleasant sensations because of rare conditions such as pain asymbolia or congenital insensitivity to pain have been studied to identify the biological and genetic mechanisms involved. In 2019, researchers reported a Scottish woman with a previously unreported mutation in a FAAH pseudogene, referred to as FAAH-OUT, and elevated anandamide levels. She was reported to have low anxiety, no fear response and reduced sensitivity to pain, while also experiencing burns and cuts that healed more quickly than average.

In 1990, Medical Hypotheses published an article by L. S. Mancini on the "genetic engineering of a world without pain":

A hypothesis is presented to the effect that everything adaptive which is achievable with a mind capable of experiencing varying degrees of both pleasure and pain (the human condition as we know it) could be achieved with a mind capable of experiencing only varying degrees of pleasure.

The development of gene editing techniques such as CRISPR has led to discussion of whether genetic variants associated with painlessness or reduced pain could be used therapeutically. Geneticist George Church has speculated about the future possibility of replacing pain with a painless sensory system:

I imagine what this would be like on another planet and in the future, and... given that imagined future, whether we would be willing to come back to where we are now. Rather than saying whether we're willing to go forward... ask whether you're willing to come back.

== Ethics and philosophy ==
=== Hedonism and utilitarianism ===
Philosophers associated with hedonism, utilitarianism and transhumanism have discussed whether suffering should be reduced or abolished through technological means. David Pearce, in The Hedonistic Imperative (1995), argues that the abolition of suffering is technically possible and morally urgent. He predicts that "the world's last unpleasant experience will be a precisely dateable event."

Nick Bostrom has argued for caution because pain can protect individuals from harm, while also supporting the use of biotechnology to reduce what he calls "a huge amount of unnecessary and undeserved suffering."

=== Objections and alternative views ===
Critics have argued that attempts to abolish suffering through biotechnology may have unwanted consequences, and that transhumanist approaches should not be the only framework used to assess suffering. Joelle Renstrom argues that many people understand suffering as part of a dualistic relation between psychological and physical states, and that its removal could affect the conditions under which pleasure is experienced.

Some psychological, religious and philosophical traditions treat suffering as a subject of interpretation, discipline or meaning rather than only as a biological state to be removed. Viktor Frankl, in Man's Search for Meaning, argued that unavoidable suffering can acquire meaning within a person's life. Buddhism and Stoicism have also been discussed as traditions that centre suffering or disturbance in ethical practice, while offering responses based on insight, discipline or judgement rather than biotechnology.

== Animal welfare ==
=== Farmed and research animals ===
In 2009, Adam Shriver suggested replacing animals in factory farming with genetically engineered animals who have a reduced or absent capacity to suffer and feel pain. Shriver and Emilie McConnachie later argued that people who wish to improve animal welfare should support gene editing alongside plant-based diets and cultured meat.

Katrien Devolder and Matthias Eggel proposed gene editing research animals to remove pain and suffering, as an intermediate step towards ending animal experimentation and adopting alternatives.

=== Wild-animal suffering ===
In relation to wild animal suffering, CRISPR-based gene drives have been proposed as a way to spread welfare-improving alleles in sexually reproducing species. The Sculpting Evolution group at the MIT Media Lab developed a self-exhausting CRISPR-based gene drive, called a "daisy-chain drive", intended to limit spread through wild populations. Proposed methods for limiting or reversing gene drives include synthetic resistance, reversal drives and immunising reversal drives.

== Feasibility ==
Pearce argues in The Abolitionist Project that suffering could in principle be eliminated by altering its biological basis. He discusses several possible approaches, including wireheading, designer drugs and genetic engineering, while favouring genetic changes that would raise hedonic set-points without removing motivation or responsiveness to the environment.

== See also ==
- Antinaturalism – Opposition to essentialist appeals to nature
- Appeal to nature – Rhetorical tactic and potential fallacy
- Biohappiness – Elevated sense of well-being using biotechnology
- Effective altruism – Philosophical and social movement
- Immanentize the Eschaton – Pejorative term for attempts to bring about utopian conditions
- Meliorism – Idea in metaphysical thinking
- Moral circle expansion – Broadening of moral consideration
- Pain in animals
- Prioritarianism – View within ethics and political philosophy
- Suffering-focused ethics – Ethical views prioritising the reduction of suffering
- Suffering risks – Scenarios of large amounts of future suffering
- Transhumanism – Philosophical movement
- Wild animal suffering – Suffering of wild animals due to natural processes
