= Wirehead (science fiction) =

Concept in fiction or futuristic applications

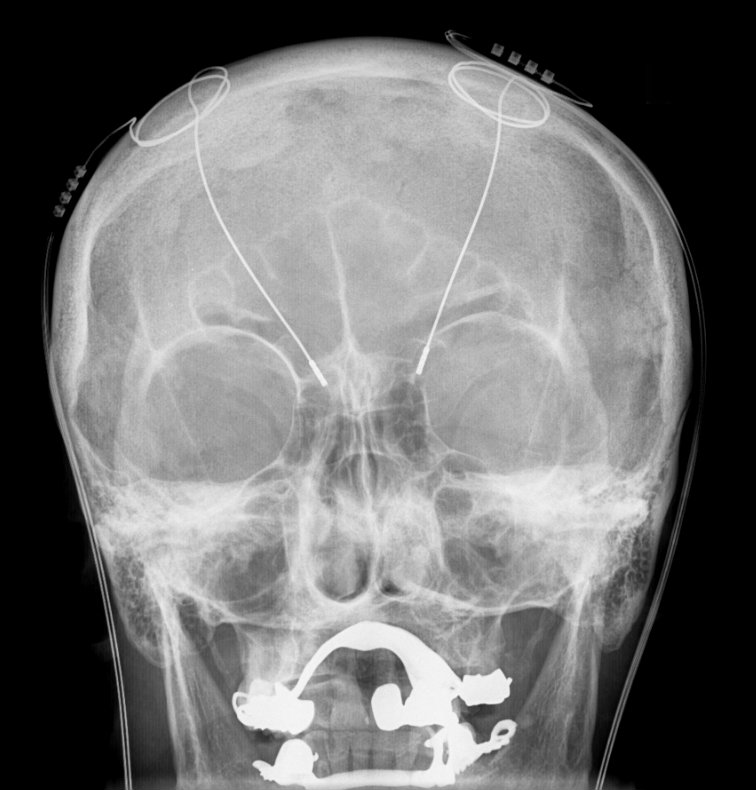
The wires of an implanted deep brain stimulation (DBS) device are visible as white lines in an X-ray of the skull. Large white areas around the maxilla and mandible are metal dentures and are unrelated to the DBS device.

In science fiction, wireheading is a term associated with fictional or futuristic applications of brain stimulation reward, the act of directly triggering the brain's reward center by electrical stimulation of an inserted wire, for the purpose of "short-circuiting" the brain's normal reward process and artificially inducing pleasure. Scientists have successfully performed brain stimulation reward on rats (1950s) and humans (1960s). This stimulation does not appear to lead to tolerance or satiation in the way that sex or drugs do. The term is sometimes associated with science fiction writer Larry Niven, who coined the term in his 1969 novella Death by Ecstasy (Known Space series). In the philosophy of artificial intelligence, the term is used to refer to AI systems that hack their own reward channel.

More broadly, the term can also refer to various kinds of interaction between human beings and technology.

== In fiction ==
=== Literature ===
Wireheading, like other forms of brain alteration, is often treated as dystopian in science fiction literature.

In Larry Niven's Known Space stories, a "wirehead" is someone who has been fitted with an electronic brain implant known as a "droud" in order to stimulate the pleasure centers of their brain. Wireheading is the most addictive habit known (Louis Wu is the only given example of a recovered addict), and wireheads usually die from neglecting their basic needs in favour of the ceaseless pleasure. Wireheading is so powerful and easy that it becomes an evolutionary pressure, selecting against that portion of humanity without self-control. A wirehead's death is central to Niven's story "Death by Ecstasy", published in 1969 under the title The Organleggers, and a main character in the book Ringworld Engineers is a former wirehead trying to quit.

Also in the Known Space universe, a device called a "tasp" which does not need a surgical implant (similar to transcranial magnetic stimulation) can be used to achieve similar goals: the pleasure center of a person's brain is found and remotely stimulated (considered a violation without seeking the person's consent beforehand). It is an important device in Niven's Ringworld novels.

Niven's stories explain wireheads by mentioning a study in which experimental rats had electrodes implanted at strategic locations in their brains, so that an applied current would induce a pleasant feeling. If the current could be obtained any time the rats pushed the lever, they would use it over and over, ignoring food and physical necessities until they died. Such experiments were actually conducted by James Olds and Peter Milner in the 1950s, first discovering the locations of such areas, and later showing the extremes to which rats would go to obtain the stimulus again.

In the novel Mindkiller (1982) by Spider Robinson, the antagonist "Jacques" has the ability to wirehead his targets by inducing an enslaving brain-ecstasy from a distance.

The Shaper/Mechanist stories by Bruce Sterling use the term "wirehead" in the broader sense of people or cyborgs who can link their minds to computers or other technology.

In The Terminal Man (1972) by Michael Crichton, forty electrodes are implanted into the brain of the character Harold Franklin "Harry" Benson to control his seizures. However, his pleasure center is also stimulated, and his body begins producing more seizures in order to receive the pleasurable sensation.

== See also ==
- Borg
- Brain–computer interface
- Brain stimulation reward
- David Pearce (philosopher)
- Experience machine
- Hedonic treadmill
- Lotus-eaters
- Metaverse
- Pain and pleasure § Deep brain stimulation
- Soma (Brave New World)
- Spatial computing
