= Prioritarianism =

View within ethics and political philosophy

Prioritarianism, the priority view, or priority to the worst off is a perspective within ethics and political philosophy stating that "social welfare orderings should give explicit priority to the worse off". Prioritarianism resembles utilitarianism, and is likewise a form of aggregative consequentialism.

The term "prioritarianism" was coined by the moral philosopher Larry Temkin. Richard Arneson, a proponent of the view, offers the following formulation:

Prioritarianism holds that the moral value of achieving a benefit for an individual (or avoiding a loss) is greater, the greater the size of the benefit as measured by a well-being scale, and the greater, the lower the person's level of well-being over the course of her life apart from receipt of this benefit.

Prioritarianism is one interpretation of distributive justice and is often pitted against egalitarianism.

== Distinction from utilitarianism ==
Prioritarianism is a portmanteau of "priority" and "utilitarianism."

While common forms of utilitarianism view the consequences of an action as having equal moral weight regardless of the person who experiences those consequences, prioritarianism dictates that the consequences of an action should be weighted differently depending on how relatively advantaged the bearer of the consequence is, ceteris paribus. Under this view, the morality of any given action is not dependent on a simple maximization of "good" produced from its consequences but, rather, dependent on the maximization of "good" that takes into account the relative (dis)advantage of the affected individual. In effect, the impacts on those who are more disadvantaged are weighted heavier in the moral calculus than those who are more advantaged.

Prioritarianism can also be understood to be a sub-theory of utilitarianism, under the interpretation of the latter as simply the maximization of "good" with the unintentional disregard for differences in utility dependent on circumstance to effected individuals.

== Comparisons to related theories ==
Proponents of prioritarianism argue that prioritarian's emphasis on compassion addresses criticisms aimed at utilitarianism of what some interpret to be disregard for marginal and relative circumstance.

It also differs from radical forms of egalitarianism that value only equality at the expense of overall maximization of good. Prioritarianism does not accord any intrinsic value to equality of well-being across individuals and would not regard a move toward a more equal distribution of well-being as better if the worse off did not benefit.

In addition to addressing common criticisms of utilitarianism and pure egalitarianism, prioritarianism also avoids criticisms of the maximin principle (also note Rawls's difference principle). The maximin principle ranks outcomes solely according to the well-being of the worst-off member of a society, potentially at the expense of overall good or of other members in society.

== Objections ==
Objections to prioritarianism include many of the standard objections that adhere to aggregative consequentialism, for instance, the repugnant conclusion and related objections based on the apparent implausibility of certain trade-offs (if there is some very large number of mild headaches such that it would be worse to bring about these mild headaches than the protracted and intense torture of an innocent person). There are also objections to quantifying, measuring, or making interpersonal comparisons of well-being, that strike against most if not all forms of aggregative consequentialism, including prioritarianism.

Another objection to prioritarianism concerns how much weight should be given to the well-being of the worse off. There may be issues of arbitrariness or "sloppy intuitionism" lurking there. Prioritarians are faced with the potentially awkward task of balancing overall well-being against priority. Any theory that leaves any room for judgment in particular cases is also susceptible to that kind of objection about sloppiness or arbitrariness. A prioritarian might claim that how much weight should be given to the well-being of the worse off is something to be worked out in reflective equilibrium, or that if weights cannot be determined exactly, there is a range of weights that is acceptable or justifiable.

In response to claims that utilitarianism may be more parsimonious than prioritarianism (which values well-being and priority), prioritarianism may argue that even a putatively genuinely monistic utilitarianism like hedonistic utilitarianism is not fully mechanized (and perhaps not even genuinely monistic) as it still requires judgment, as when it comes to balancing various pleasures against various pains.

== See also ==
- Painism - a similar ethical view that prioritizes the maximum sufferer
- Suffering-focused ethics
