= David Pearce (philosopher) =

British transhumanist philosopher (born 1959)

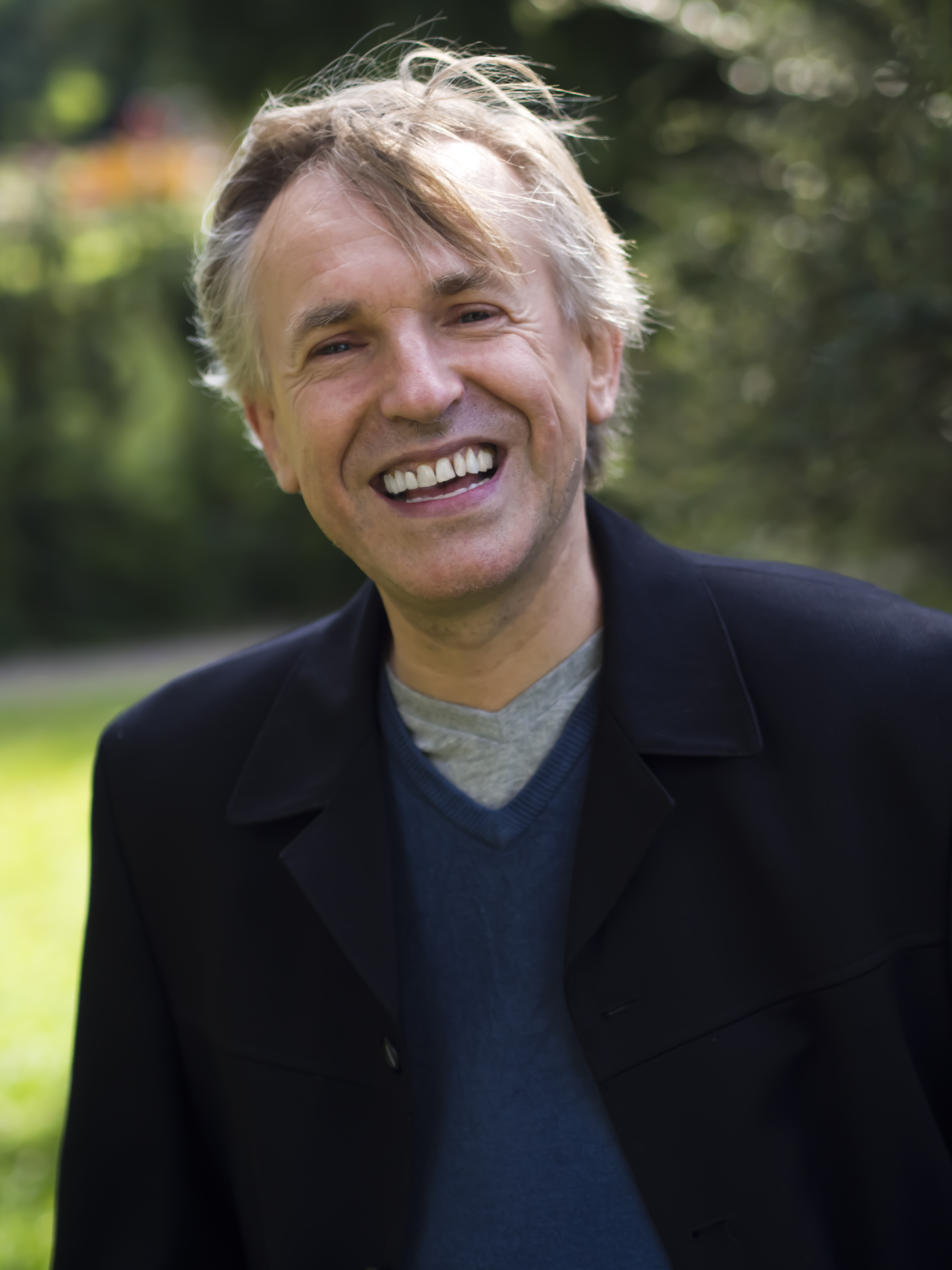
- Pearce in 2013
- Born: April 1959 (age 67)
- Education: Brasenose College, Oxford
- Organisation: Humanity+
- Known for: The Hedonistic Imperative (1995)
- Movement: Transhumanism, veganism
- Website: hedweb.com

David Pearce (born April 1959) is a British transhumanist philosopher. He is the co-founder of the World Transhumanist Association, currently rebranded and incorporated as Humanity+. Pearce approaches ethical issues from a negative utilitarian perspective.

Based in Brighton, England, Pearce maintains a series of websites devoted to transhumanist topics and what he calls the "hedonistic imperative", a moral obligation to work towards the abolition of suffering in all sentient life. His self-published internet manifesto, The Hedonistic Imperative (1995), outlines how pharmacology, genetic engineering, nanotechnology and neurosurgery could converge to eliminate all forms of unpleasant experience from human and non-human life, replacing suffering with "information-sensitive gradients of bliss". Pearce calls this the "abolitionist project".

== Early life and education ==
Pearce grew up in Burpham, Surrey. His parents, grandparents and three of his great-grandparents were all vegetarian and his father was a Quaker. From a young age, Pearce was concerned with death and aging, and later the problem of suffering. He became a secular scientific rationalist around the age of 10 or 11.

Pearce received a scholarship to study Politics, Philosophy and Economics at the University of Oxford, but never finished his degree.

== Hedonistic transhumanism ==
In 1995, Pearce set up BLTC Research, a network of websites publishing texts about transhumanism and related topics in pharmacology and biopsychiatry. He published The Hedonistic Imperative that year, arguing that "[o]ur post-human successors will rewrite the vertebrate genome, redesign the global ecosystem, and abolish suffering throughout the living world."

Pearce's ideas inspired an abolitionist school of transhumanism, or "hedonistic transhumanism", based on his idea of "paradise engineering" and his argument that the abolition of suffering—which he calls the "abolitionist project"—is a moral imperative. He defends a version of negative utilitarianism.

He outlines how drugs and technologies, including intracranial self-stimulation ("wireheading"), designer drugs and genetic engineering could end suffering for all sentient life. Mental suffering will be a relic of the past, just as physical suffering during surgery was eliminated by anaesthesia. The function of pain will be provided by some other signal, without the unpleasant experience.

A vegan, Pearce argues that humans have a responsibility not only to avoid cruelty to animals within human society but also to redesign the global ecosystem so that animals do not suffer in the wild. He has argued in favour of a "cross-species global analogue of the welfare state", suggesting that humanity might eventually "reprogram predators" to limit predation, reducing the suffering of animals who are predated. Fertility regulation could maintain herbivore populations at sustainable levels, "a more civilised and compassionate policy option than famine, predation, and disease". The increasing number of vegans and vegetarians in the transhumanism movement has been attributed in part to Pearce's influence.

== Humanity+ and other roles ==
In 1998, Pearce co-founded the World Transhumanist Association, known from 2008 as Humanity+, with Nick Bostrom. Pearce is a member of the board of advisors.

Currently, Pearce is a fellow of the Institute for Ethics and Emerging Technologies, and sits on the futurist advisory board of the Lifeboat Foundation. He is also the director of bioethics of Invincible Wellbeing and is on the advisory boards of the Center on Long-Term Risk, the Organisation for the Prevention of Intense Suffering and since 2021 the Qualia Research Institute.

Until 2013, Pearce was on the editorial advisory board of the controversial and non-peer-reviewed journal Medical Hypotheses. He has been interviewed by Vanity Fair (Germany) and on BBC Radio 4's Moral Maze, among others.

Pearce currently serves as an advisory board member for Herbivorize Predators, an organization whose mission is to discover how to transform carnivorous animals into herbivorous ones in order to minimize suffering across all species.

== Publications ==
- The Hedonistic Imperative. 1995. OCLC 44325836.
- "The Biointelligence Explosion: How Recursively Self-Improving Organic Robots will Modify their Own Source Code and Bootstrap Our Way to Full-Spectrum Superintelligence" in Eden, A. H.; Moor, J. H.; Soraker, J. H.; Steinhart, E., eds. (2012). Singularity Hypotheses: A Scientific and Philosophical Assessment. Heidelberg: Springer. pp. 199–238. ISBN 978-3-64232559-5. OCLC 915554031.
- Can Biotechnology Abolish Suffering?. Vinding, M. (Ed.). 2017. ASIN B075MV9KS2

== See also ==
- List of animal rights advocates
