= Normativity =

Standards of what ought to be

Normativity concerns the standards of what should, ought to, or must be the case.

Normativity concerns the standards of what people should do, believe, or value. It is a quality of rules, judgments, or concepts that prescribe how things should be or what individuals may, must, or must not do. Normative claims express what ought to be the case, such as "you should not smoke". They contrast with descriptive claims about what is the case, such as "you smoked yesterday". Normativity shapes many everyday activities, such as decision-making, evaluating outcomes, criticizing others, and justifying actions.

Researchers discuss many types of normativity. Practical normativity is about what to do, while theoretical normativity concerns what to believe. Deontic normativity deals with what is allowed, required, or forbidden, whereas evaluative normativity addresses the values underlying normative assessments. Objective normativity encompasses requirements that do not depend on personal views, in contrast to subjective normativity, which is about standards relative to subjective perspectives. Normative assessments can be partial by only taking certain aspects into account, or comprehensive by considering all relevant factors. Other distinctions are based on the domain of assessment, such as moral, social, legal, and linguistic norms. Some categories may overlap, and there are academic disagreements about whether all these types are genuine forms of normativity.

Various theories about the nature and sources of normativity have been proposed. Realists assert that there are objective facts about what is right and wrong, a view rejected by anti-realists. Naturalists and non-naturalists discuss whether normative facts are part of the empirical domain studied by the natural sciences. Cognitivists and non-cognitivists debate whether normative judgments can be true or false. Reductionists seek to explain normative concepts through non-normative ones, while primitivists deny that this is possible. Reason-based and value-based views disagree about whether normativity is ultimately grounded in reasons or values. Other theories address the authoritative force of normativity, its relation to the mind, and the sources of normative knowledge.

Several fields of inquiry study normative phenomena. In philosophy, ethics addresses practical normativity while epistemology deals with theoretical normativity. Psychology examines normative cognitions or how norms are learned, practiced, and sanctioned. Sociology and anthropology analyze social norms as shared and enforced rules that regulate communal behavior and vary across cultures. Linguistics deals with standards of correct language use, while law addresses the legitimacy of legal systems. Other fields interested in normative phenomena include economics, medicine, and neuroscience.

== Definition ==
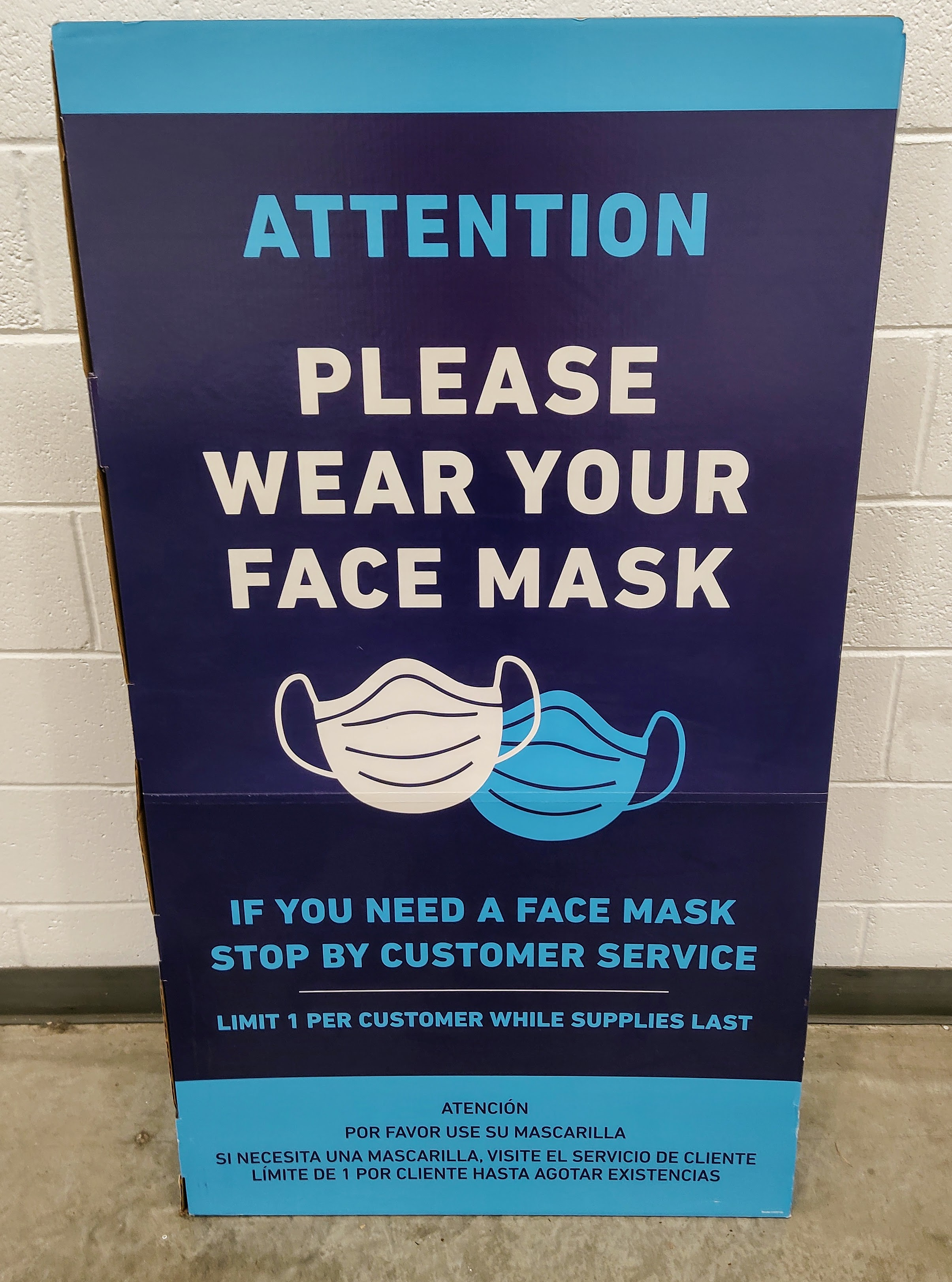
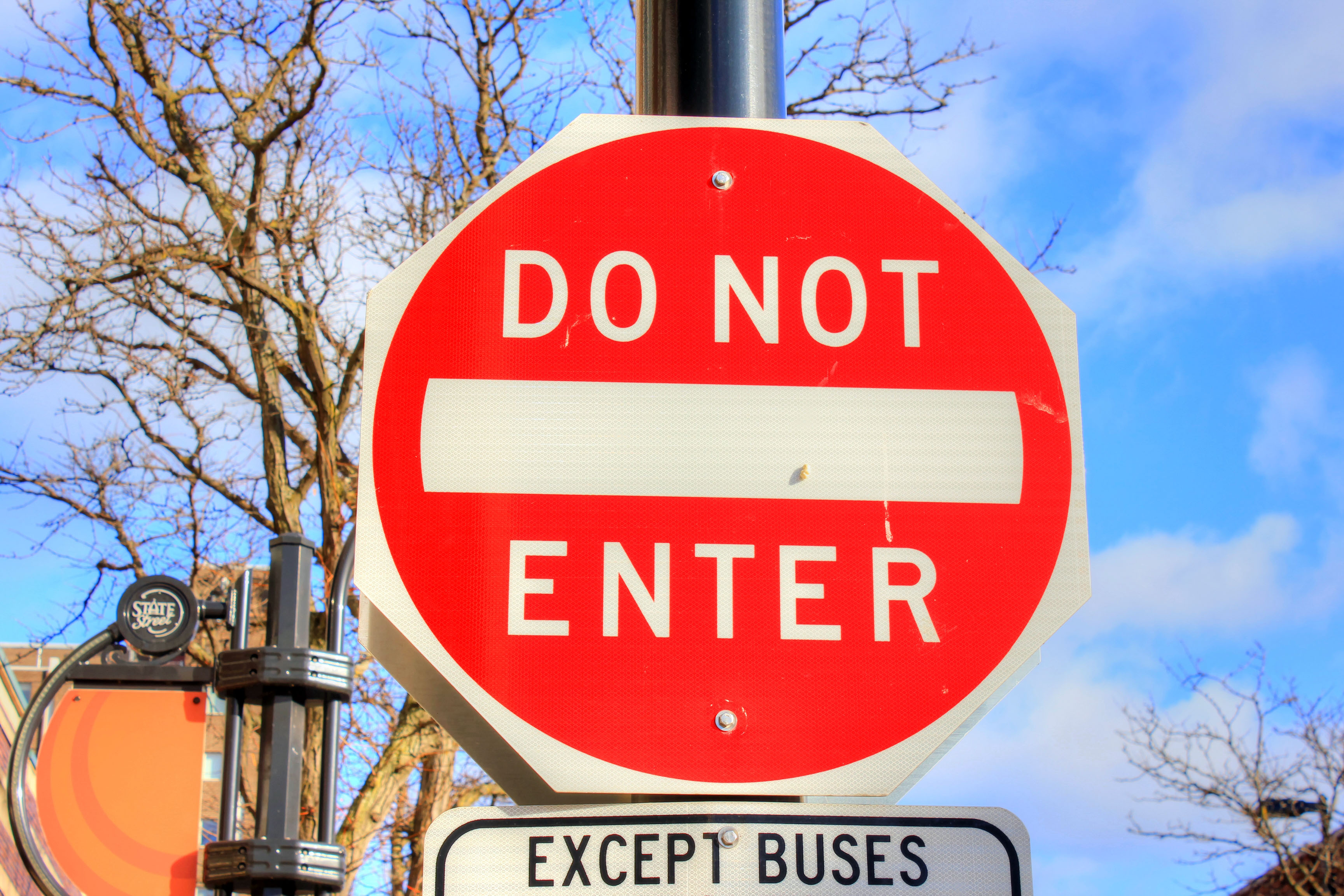
Some norms require specific actions, such as putting on a face mask, while others prohibit certain behavior, like entering a restricted area.

Normativity is a quality of concepts, judgments, or principles that prescribe how things ought to be. As a feature of everything that should be, it encompasses the standards or reasons that guide or justify actions and beliefs. In a slightly different sense, normativity can also refer to the capacity to establish and modify norms. Normative statements contrast with descriptive statements, which report what is the case rather than what should be the case. For example, the sentence "you should not smoke" is normative because it expresses a norm and prescribes a course of action. The sentence "you smoked yesterday", by contrast, is descriptive since it merely states a fact. (Note: Philosophers debate the precise relation between normative and descriptive claims. Some proposals deny that there is a strict distinction and define normativity in terms of non-normative phenomena.)

Normativity is a pervasive phenomenon in everyday life that occurs when evaluating or criticizing others and when attempting to justify one's own actions. Similarly, it is involved in practical deliberation when deciding what to do next and in theoretical reasoning when assessing whether the available evidence supports a belief. Normativity is relevant to many domains, including morality, law, politics, language, and the human sciences. Philosophers debate whether it is a unified phenomenon (Note: For example, reason-first theories of normativity provide a unified account, arguing that normativity means that there is a reason to do or think something.) that applies equally to all of these cases or a heterogeneous collection of related ideas whose precise definition varies with context and domain.

Normative claims can be analyzed in terms of their content, such as a rule that should be followed, and the authority or normative force they carry. For example, some normative reasons merely favor one course of action over another, while others strictly demand a specific conduct. In either case, a normative reason does not coerce compliance: individuals may act otherwise out of ignorance or against their better judgment. Accordingly, there can be a difference between what a person desires or intends and what they normatively should do.

Normativity is closely related to norms, understood as general principles of how individuals should act or think. However, the term norm also has meanings not directly related to normativity. For example, a statistical norm is a statement about what is typical or average, such as the average height of adult men, without implying that things should be this way. Similarly, normativity is distinguished from mere regularities or common practices, such as a habit of eating dinner at a particular time. There are many normative concepts, such as right and wrong, good and bad, rational and irrational, justified and unjustified, and permitted and obligated.

The word normativity originates in the Latin term norma, meaning 'rule' or 'pattern'. It gave rise to the French word normatif, which entered English as the term normative in the 19th century. The word normativity was coined in the 1930s as a technical term in academic discourse.

The study of normativity has its roots in antiquity as discussions of different types of normative requirements. Plato and Aristotle examined the norms of moral conduct and the good life, as well as standards of knowledge and reasoning. In modern philosophy, David Hume investigated the contrast between normative and non-normative phenomena, arguing that one cannot deduce what ought to be from what is, a contrast later pursued by G. E. Moore. Immanuel Kant analyzed the normative domains of theoretical knowledge, practical morality, and aesthetic judgment. By raising the question of their underlying unity, he inspired subsequent philosophers to seek systematic principles grounding and connecting these domains. Edmund Husserl in the 1930s and Georges Canguilhem in the 1940s introduced normativity as a technical term for the power of creating and changing norms, with Husserl focusing on the realm of ideas while Canguilhem explored functional norms and pathologies of organisms. Diverse theories of the nature, sources, unity, and reality of normative phenomena were later developed by J. L. Mackie, T. M. Scanlon, Derek Parfit, Simon Blackburn, and Christine Korsgaard.

== Types ==
Several types of normativity are discussed in the academic literature distinguished by domain, content, authority, or perspective. Some distinctions may overlap or may be combined to form more specific subtypes. There are theoretical disagreements about whether only some types are genuine forms of normativity and whether some kinds are more fundamental than others.

=== Practical and theoretical ===
Practical normativity addresses conduct or what people should decide, intend, and do. It is interested in the standards of right action and the reasons that favor one course of action over another. It contrasts with theoretical or epistemic normativity, which governs how people should think or what they should believe. Theoretical normativity concerns mental states and belief-formation processes related to truth and knowledge. For example, the sentence "she should stop drinking" belongs to practical normativity, whereas the sentence "he should not believe the rumor without evidence" belongs to theoretical normativity.

These two types are often studied separately, with the field of ethics focusing on the practical side and the field of epistemology focusing on the theoretical side. Nonetheless, there are many parallels and interactions. For example, beliefs may influence what should be done, as when someone should buy eggs because they intend to bake a cake and believe that eggs are required. Similarly, practical consequences can influence belief norms. For instance, a person may be justified in believing that their bank is open on Saturday based on past experience if it concerns a minor matter. However, if it concerns a major matter, like the risk of losing their house by missing a mortgage payment because the bank is closed, the standards of belief may be higher and require additional verification beyond personal memory.

In some cases, practical and theoretical normativity may conflict, raising the question of how or whether this type of dilemma can be resolved. For example, if there is strong evidence in favor of adopting a negative opinion about a friend, theoretical normativity may require doing so while practical normativity rooted in friendship may demand granting them the benefit of doubt. Similar dilemmas can arise in cases where violating epistemic norms by believing a falsehood has positive practical consequences.

=== Deontic and evaluative ===
Deontic normativity covers norms that directly apply to right thought and action. These norms are action-guiding by telling individuals what to do and demanding certain forms of conduct, expressed through concepts such as right, wrong, obligation, and permission. Evaluative normativity, by contrast, is about values or what is good. (Note: Self-interested evaluative norms, such as a person looking out for what is primarily good for them, belong to the subfield of prudential normativity.) It describes what is worthy of approval, expressed through concepts such as good, bad, praiseworthy, and virtuous. (Note: According to one interpretation, evaluative normativity is attitude-guiding by prescribing how people should feel or evaluate.)

These two forms of normativity are closely related and often overlap, as when an action is right because it is good or has good consequences. However, they are not identical and can come apart. For instance, some value considerations cannot guide actions because they are beyond anyone's control. Several theories of the relation between deontic and evaluative normativity have been suggested, including the idea that one is more fundamental and can be used to define the other. Understood in a narrow sense, normativity is sometimes limited to deontic normativity.

=== Objective and subjective ===
A requirement is objectively normative if it applies to a person regardless of what the person believes or knows about it. Subjective normativity, by contrast, encompasses information-relative demands that depend on the individual's perspective and the information available to them. (Note: Several subtypes of subjective normativity have been proposed based on the kind of information-relevance involved, for instance, whether it depends on any belief, only on reasonable beliefs, or on available evidence.)

Objective and subjective normativity overlap when a person objectively should do something and at the same time subjectively believes that they should do it. However, they can come apart if the individual lacks or has false information, which can lead to actions with unintended bad consequences. This is the case in a scenario where all available evidence suggests that a pill would cure a patient's disease, although the pill is, in truth, deadly for this particular patient. In this case, the patient should take the pill in a subjective sense but not in an objective sense. Various academic debates address the relation between the two forms of normativity and whether both are equally fundamental and authoritative.

=== Pro tanto and all-things-considered ===
Position: a8 black rook, b8 black knight, c8 black bishop, d8 black queen, e8 black king, f8 black bishop, h8 black rook, b7 black pawn, e7 black pawn, f7 black pawn, g7 black pawn, h7 black pawn, a6 black pawn, d6 black pawn, f6 black knight, d4 white knight, e4 white pawn, c3 white knight, a2 white pawn, b2 white pawn, c2 white pawn, f2 white pawn, g2 white pawn, h2 white pawn, a1 white rook, c1 white bishop, d1 white queen, e1 white king, f1 white bishop, h1 white rook

The rules of games like chess have formal normativity: they prescribe which moves are allowed or prohibited but their normative authority exists only relative to the game and can be overridden by other considerations.

A normative reason is pro tanto if it favors an action or state in a certain respect or from a specific perspective. For example, if a joke is funny, then this is a pro tanto reason for telling it. However, pro tanto reasons are limited considerations that do not take everything into account and can be defeated by other reasons. If the joke would offend someone, this is a separate pro tanto reason for not telling it. Normative all-things-considered assessments, by contrast, take all relevant factors into account. They weigh all advantages and disadvantages and prescribe an action or state as a conclusive judgment not limited to domain-specific considerations.

A closely related distinction is between formal and robust normativity, also discussed as generic and authoritative normativity. Formal normativity arises from any standards or norms relative to which a mistake can be made. It is a pervasive phenomenon in everyday life, encompassing domains such as law, linguistic conventions, table manners, and games. For example, the rules of chess belong to formal normativity, like the prescription that pawns may move forward but not backward. The normative authority of this type of formal standard typically depends on context and can be overridden by other considerations. Robust normativity, by contrast, carries genuine normative force independent of contingent frameworks. It does not arise from arbitrarily defined rules or standards but is instead tied to more fundamental normative requirements, like the general authority of moral requirements in contrast to the context-bound authority of legal pawn-movements relative to the framework of chess.

=== Others ===
Various types of normativity are distinguished by the domain to which they belong. For example, moral normativity concerns duties, rights, and moral obligations as well as standards of praise and blame. It is closely related to legal normativity, which covers the authority of the legal system, and political normativity, which encompasses the exercise of political power. Linguistic normativity, another type, is about following linguistic conventions, such as the rules of grammar. Similarly, rational normativity governs the standards of correct reasoning.

Instrumental normativity encompasses normative requirements that depend on external goals. For example, if a person should attend a concert, then they should make the necessary preparations, such as buying a ticket. In such cases, there is an end or a goal that should be achieved, and the required means of implementation in some sense inherit the normative force attached to the goal. Instrumental normativity is closely related to hypothetical normative requirements, which depend on the desires or intentions of a person. The normative force of categorical requirements, by contrast, applies independently of what an individual wants. A similar distinction is between necessary norms, which apply equally to any situation, and contingent norms, which apply only to specific circumstances or contexts. For example, region-specific laws against smoking in bars are contingent norms.

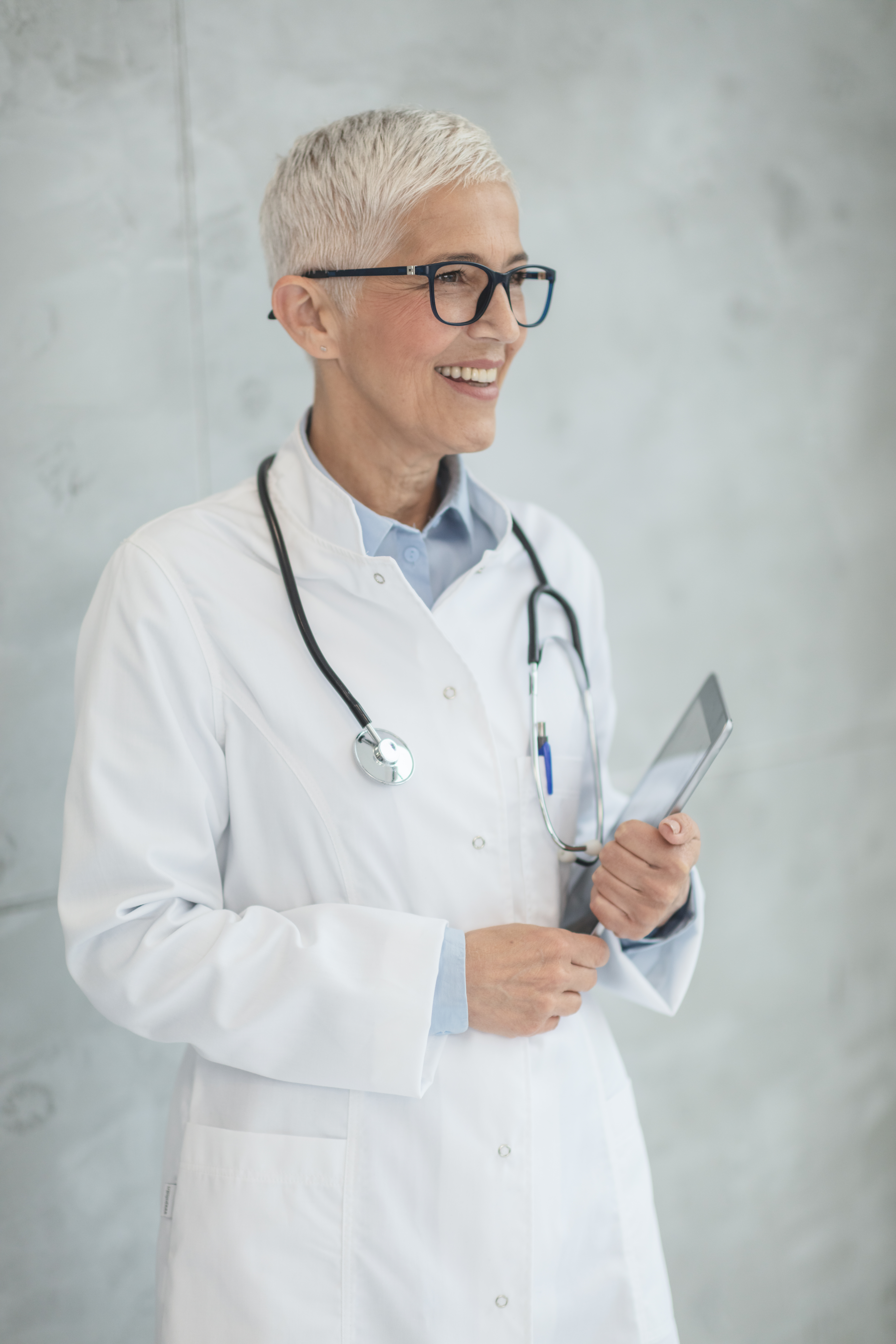
Agent-relative normative requirements can arise from a person's social role, such as responsibilities of medical professionals.

Agent-relative normativity encompasses requirements that in some sense depend on and affect a specific person but not others. It may arise from the particular social role of a person, such as standards or expectations associated with being a teacher, doctor, or mother. Previous behavior can also be a source of agent-relative normativity, like when someone should do something because they made a promise. Agent-relative normativity contrasts with agent-neutral normativity, which applies equally to everyone.

Another distinction is between constitutive and regulative norms. Constitutive norms are part of the definition of a specific activity. For example, the constitutive norms of soccer determine what counts as a goal and how players may interact with the ball. People who do not follow constitutive norms of an activity are not engaged in this activity. Regulative norms are commands, prohibitions, or permissions about how people should behave, and violating them is a type of mistake.

There are different normative statuses corresponding to whether something is obligatory, prohibited, or permitted. In some cases, it may also be possible to do more than is normatively required, a state known as supererogation. The concepts used to express normative status can be either thin or thick. Thin normative concepts express a purely normative assessment without any additional information, such as the terms ought, should, right, and wrong. Thick normative concepts include descriptive information beyond a purely normative evaluation. For instance, the terms courageous, kind, brutal, and callous not only give a normative judgment but also convey information about character and emotional quality. They typically explain why or in what sense the normative assessment applies.

== Theories ==
Various theories of the nature and sources of normativity have been proposed. They seek to determine what all forms of normativity have in common, how normative requirements arise, and what grounds their authority. Theories further aim to explain how normative ideas motivate actions and how their demands are justified. Some address what normative statements mean (semantics) or how people can know about them (epistemology), while others address their underlying reality (metaphysics). Certain theories are mutually exclusive, meaning that if one is true, the other has to be false. Others provide complementary accounts that can be combined without contradiction. The study of the nature and sources of normativity across domains, such as ethics, epistemology, and law, is called meta-normative theory.

=== Realism and anti-realism ===
Normative realism is the view that there are objective normative facts about what is right and wrong, similar to physical facts about the weight and shape of objects. Normative realists typically hold that normative sentences can be true or false and that at least some are true. They further emphasize that their truth depends on objective facts, i.e., that it is not just a matter of opinions, feelings, or intentions, but that truth is grounded in mind-independent reality. Anti-realists deny that normativity is a substantial or fundamental feature of reality. There are intermediate positions without a universally accepted terminology. For example, the view that normativity is real but subjective does not belong to realism in a narrow sense but may be included under a broader understanding of the term.

Realist theories are divided into naturalism and non-naturalism. Naturalists argue that normative features are part of the natural world, meaning that there is no essential difference between normative facts and the empirical facts studied by the natural sciences. Non-naturalists assert that normative facts belong to a distinct part of reality. This outlook is often combined with the ideas that one cannot deduce normative sentences from empirical sentences, that empirical observation alone cannot reveal normative facts, and that a distinct source of knowledge, such as rational intuition, is required.

Realism is typically paired with cognitivism, a view about the meaning of normative sentences. Cognitivists assert that normative claims represent what the world is like and have truth values. Non-cognitivists reject the idea that normative sentences can be true or false. They usually accept that normative language has some form of meaning and have proposed several ways to explain its meaning without representation and truth values. Expressivism is one such proposal arguing that normative language is used to express personal attitudes and emotions. According to one version of expressivism, to say that an action is wrong means that the speaker dislikes the action, similar to yelling "Boo!" as a sign of disapproval. Non-cognitivism is primarily associated with anti-realism, but it is also possible to combine cognitivism with anti-realism. For example, error theory holds that normative statements have truth values and that all of them are false because there are no normative facts.

A key topic in the debate between realists and anti-realists concerns the distinctive character of normative facts, leading critics to describe normativity as an odd phenomenon. They assert that irreducible prescriptions would be mysterious entities that are not easily integrated into a scientific worldview. A similar objection focuses on knowledge of normative facts and suggests that how people acquire and justify normative beliefs is equally odd and undermines their credibility. Supporters of realism hold that normative facts are required to explain experiences and practices associated with normativity. For instance, claims about what should be are typically formulated like claims about what is, indicating that the former can be true or false just like the latter. Another line of support maintains that when people disagree and argue about normative judgments, they implicitly assume the existence of an underlying truth since there would be no genuine disagreement otherwise.

=== Primitivism and reductionism ===
Closely related to the realism debate is the distinction between primitivism and reductionism. Primitivism, also called normativism, argues that normative concepts or facts are fundamental. This means that they cannot be defined in non-normative terms or clarified without circularity. Quietist realism combines primitivism with realism: it accepts the existence of moral phenomena but denies that any substantive explanation is possible. Instead of developing a positive account of the nature of normativity, it defends realism indirectly by diagnosing mistakes that lead philosophers to adopt anti-realism. Primitivism is typically embraced by non-naturalists to emphasize the autonomy of the normative domain from scientific explanation. However, naturalist primitivism is also possible as the view that normativity is accessible through natural investigation but not analyzable in terms of other natural phenomena.

Primitivism contrasts with reductionism, which seeks to explain normative concepts through non-normative ones. Reductionists do not outright deny the existence of normativity but hold that it is not something entirely novel or mysterious since it can be analyzed through unproblematic and well-understood concepts. Reductionism often takes the form of naturalism by seeking to show how empirical features, such as mental attitudes studied by psychologists, form the foundation of normativity. In a slightly weaker sense, reduction can also mean that one type of normative concept or fact is explained through another, such as conceptual analyses that define what ought to be in terms of reasons, values, or goals.

The discussion between primitivism and reductionism is closely related to the is–ought problem—the question of whether one can deduce what ought to be from what is. For example, if a pro-life advocate uses scientific facts about fertilization to prove that abortion is wrong, they attempt to derive a normative conclusion from descriptive premises. It is controversial whether this type of proof can be valid in principle. Critics argue that normative knowledge belongs to a different domain than descriptive knowledge, meaning that empirical data cannot directly justify moral principles. According to them, people formulate invalid arguments, termed naturalistic fallacies, if they ignore these boundaries.

=== Reason-based ===
Reason-based theories explain normativity in terms of reasons.

Reason-based theories, sometimes called reasons first accounts, explain normativity in terms of reasons. This approach reduces other normative concepts, such as ought, should, right, and wrong, to facts about reasons. (Note: Reason fundamentalism, a closely related view, asserts that reasons are the most fundamental normative concepts and cannot be explained through other concepts.) For example, saying that someone ought to learn swimming may be interpreted as saying that there is an adequate or decisive reason to do so. Reasons are often treated as relational entities that connect a ground, such as the risk of drowning, to an appropriate response or state, such as learning to swim. Normative reasons vary in strength: not all are sufficiently strong to fully justify a course of action and they may be counterbalanced by other reasons. Accordingly, reason-based theories typically focus on the balance of reasons or argue that a sufficient or decisive reason determines the overall normative demand. (Note: Philosophers debate to what extent the awareness of reasons is primarily receptive as a sensitivity to considerations rather than an active or spontaneous endorsement.)

Reason-based accounts are primarily interested in normative reasons, which are distinguished from motivating reasons. From a forward-looking perspective, a motivating reason is a mental state that causes a person to act in a certain way. From a backward-looking perspective, a motivating reason explains why the person acted as they did. A normative reason, by contrast, is a fact or consideration that favors one course of action over another. It justifies what should or should not be done, regardless of whether a person responds to it. Motivating and normative reasons can overlap if a person's motivational state aligns with what normative reasons require, but they can come apart. For example, if someone falsely believes that their partner is unfaithful, there may be a motivating reason to punish them but no normative reason.

Many reason-based accounts aim to provide a unified explanation of different types of normativity, like practical normativity about what to do and theoretical normativity about what to believe. One proposed unification argues that both types are about following reasons: reasons that favor a course of action in the practical case and reasons that support a belief in the theoretical case. Some reason-based accounts also seek to define values through reasons. For instance, the buck-passing account of goodness explains evaluative normativity in terms of reasons. It maintains that something is good if its features provide adequate reasons to have a positive attitude toward it, such as a favorable feeling, emotion, and desire.

Closely connected to reason-based accounts is the idea that normativity can be defined by focusing on how it guides reasoning and action without directly relying on the notion of reasons. For example, Ralph Wedgwood suggests that a concept is normative if it sets standards of what to think and do.

==== Internalism and externalism ====
A central debate about the nature of reasons is between internalism and externalism. Internalism is the view that normative reasons depend in some sense on the psychology of a person so that the individual can, at least in principle, be motivated by them. This does not mean that the person is actually motivated. It typically has a weaker requirement: the person would be motivated under the right conditions, for instance, upon proper reflection. Internalists highlight the psychological connection between reasons and action, arguing that a fact or consideration cannot become a normative reason without this link.

Externalists accept that there is a psychological connection in some cases but deny that it is essential. For them, it is conceivable that a person is required to do something even if it is impossible for them to become motivated to do it. A central source of disagreement between internalism and externalism comes from moral absolutism, the view that some actions are wrong for anyone, independent of personal motivations and desires. For example, a moral absolutist may argue that Hitler's order to commit genocide was wrong in principle, independent of Hitler's psychology. While this outlook is compatible with externalism, it conflicts with internalism, which maintains that normative requirements must be able to guide actions.

=== Value-based ===
Value-based theories explain normativity in terms of values.

Value-based theories, also called value-first accounts, assert that normativity is ultimately grounded in values. They hold that values are fundamental and reduce other normative concepts to evaluative facts. The idea underlying this approach is that something should be done or ought to be the case because it is valuable or brings about values in some form.

Several value-based theories have been proposed. Consequentialism, a theory of practical normativity, asserts that an action is right if it brings about the best consequences. According to this view, the normative status of an action depends on the values of its consequences compared to the outcomes of alternative actions. Not all value-based theories rely on the idea that the sum of values should be maximized. For example, according to Joseph Raz's proposal, values provide reasons for what to do, and normativity is about compliance with all relevant reasons rather than value-maximization. A different approach, advanced by Judith Jarvis Thomson, suggests that value standards of virtues and defects govern normative standards of correctness. In the field of theoretical normativity, epistemic instrumentalism is the idea that standards of belief and justification are ultimately about epistemic values, such as truth, which act as cognitive goals.

=== Other theories ===
Normative formalism asserts that normativity is merely a formal feature of rules and norms. In this sense, any rule that calls for something is equally normative, including rules of games, social conventions, and moral imperatives. This view does not distinguish between unimportant or empty rules, which people may freely ignore, and robust or authoritative rules, which have genuine normative authority.

Objectualism and conceptualism disagree about the kinds of entities that have normative properties. Objectualism asserts that normativity applies to worldly objects or states of affairs, a view typically combined with realism. Conceptualism argues that normativity is primarily found in the realm of thought as an aspect of concepts or ideas. It is more closely associated with anti-realism. According to one proposal, mental phenomena are inherently normative, meaning that standards of correctness govern how they function, like justification and rationality as standards of beliefs.

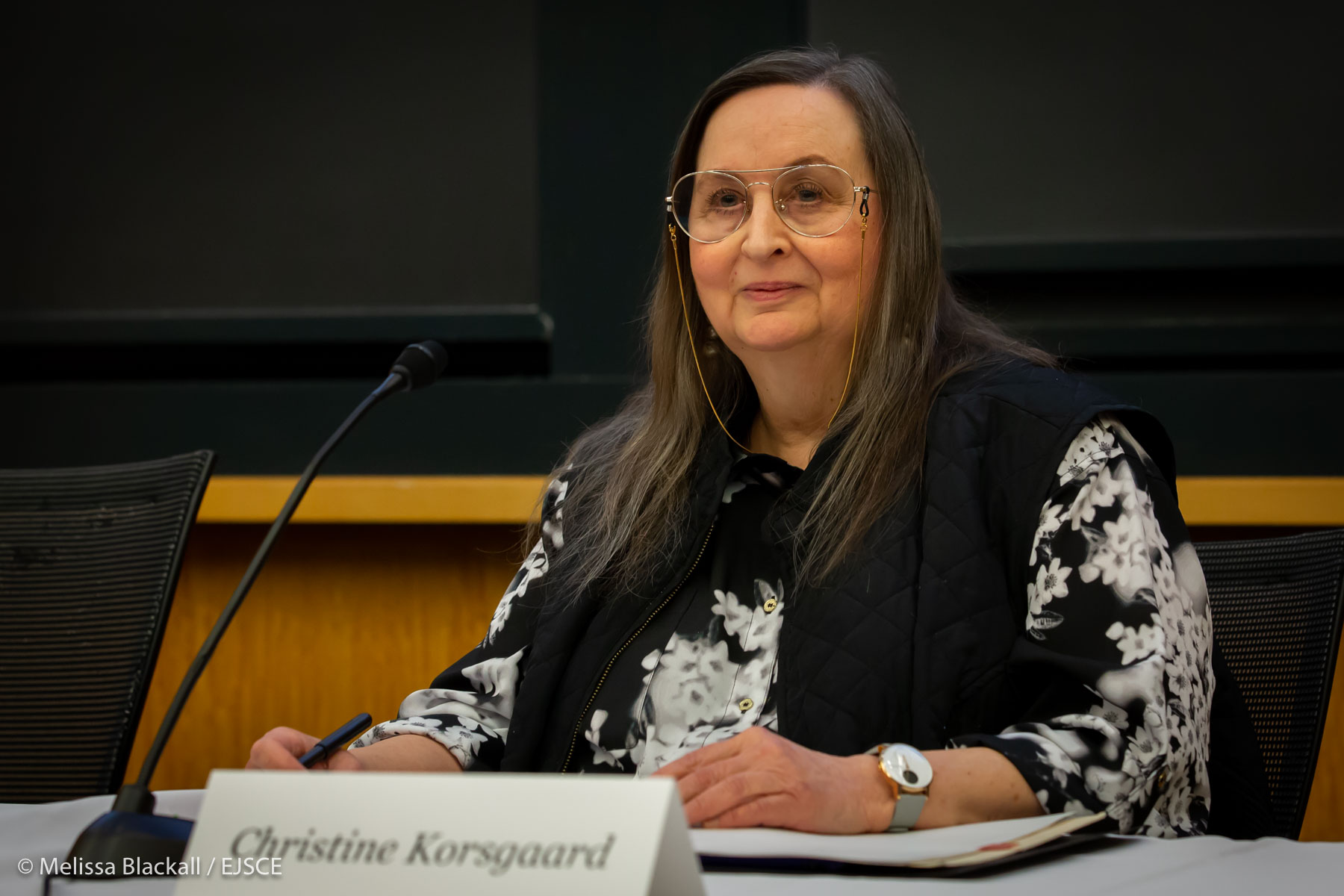
According to Christine Korsgaard's constructivism, universal principles act as the sources of normativity, applying equally to all practical agents.

Constructivism, a related perspective, suggests that normativity depends on the mind and is ultimately a product of the will. It asserts that norms arise and acquire authoritative force because of the fundamental principles of how people deliberate about courses of action, make decisions, and commit themselves. For example, Christine Korsgaard argues that certain universal principles act as sources of normativity because they apply to all practical agents, similar to Immanuel Kant's categorical imperative, and that an individual cannot be a practical agent if they do not follow these principles.

Korsgaard categorizes historical theories of the sources of normativity into voluntarism, realism, reflective endorsement, and appeal to autonomy. Voluntarism grounds normativity in commands by a legitimate authority, such as God or a political ruler. Realism asserts that evaluative or normative facts have fundamental and mind-independent existence. The reflective endorsement view grounds normativity in human nature as norms that humans naturally desire, endorse, or uphold. The appeal to autonomy is a form of constructivism that interprets norms as fundamental laws of the will that are embedded in autonomous agents who have authority over themselves.

Epistemological theories explore how knowledge of normative statements is possible. Intuitionism holds that humans have a special cognitive ability to rationally grasp some normative statements directly as self-evident truths, similar to the immediate insight into certain mathematical principles. Other approaches see empirical observation as the source of normative knowledge or argue for coherentism, according to which normative beliefs mutually support each other by forming part of a coherent web of beliefs.

Philosophers question whether there is fundamentally only a single normative property that can explain all normative phenomena. An alternative view suggests that normativity encompasses a family of properties that express related but distinct aspects but cannot be unified. The theory of perspectivism (Note: The term perspectivism is also used in a slightly different sense for the theory that normative requirements are not absolute or universal for everyone but depend on the perspective of the individual.) uses this idea to explain the diversity of theories and the deep disagreements between them. It suggests that the term normativity is ambiguous by referring to several connected phenomena. This view proposes that theorists sometimes talk about distinct phenomena, meaning that they do not really disagree but merely address different questions under the same label.

Universalism is the view that some normative standards apply equally to everyone, regardless of their culture. It contrasts with cultural relativism, which asserts that normative requirements are culture-dependent. According to this view, the standards of right and wrong vary between societies and must be judged relative to culture-specific contexts without universal or transcultural standards.

== In various fields ==
=== Philosophy ===
Many branches of philosophy are interested in normativity. Ethics examines practical normativity, with its subfields focusing on distinct aspects. Normative ethics studies general standards of right behavior, such as the utilitarian maxim of promoting the greatest happiness for the greatest number. Applied ethics explores normative requirements in specific domains, like business practices and the treatment of animals. Meta-ethics investigates the assumptions underlying normative assessments, including whether moral judgments can be objectively true. Political philosophy, a related field, considers the norms and values guiding political action. (Note: Political philosophy differs in this respect from political science, which focuses on empirical description.) It examines which uses of political power are legitimate and compares political ideologies describing desirable social arrangements, such as liberalism, socialism, conservatism, and anarchism.

Epistemology deals with theoretical normativity. It studies the sources of knowledge, norms of justification, and standards of belief formation. It overlaps with the philosophy of mind, which is interested in the normativity of mental phenomena covering beliefs and other psychological processes, such as desires, feelings, and intentions. Among other things, it seeks to discern under what conditions a particular mental state is appropriate, such as norms of rationality. Logic, another connected discipline, studies the standards of correct reasoning and argumentation. It examines rules of inference, such as modus ponens, and fallacies, which fall short of the norms of good reasoning, such as false dilemmas. It includes deontic logic, a framework for the logical analysis of obligations and permissions.

=== Psychology ===
Norm psychology examines normative cognition, which encompasses psychological processes involved in learning, following, and enforcing norms. Norms in this context are social rules, often informal and context-dependent, specifying what people may, must, or must not do. They can be learned explicitly through mentoring or implicitly through observation and inference. Once acquired, norms guide behavior and act as evaluative standards. Additionally, they motivate individuals to teach them to others and punish violations. (Note: Understood in the widest sense, psychological normativity is not limited to cognitions that explicitly address normative issues: there are implicit norms governing the appropriateness of many or all mental states. For example, anger or grief are appropriate responses to some circumstances but not others, and the degree of an emotional response can also be adequate or excessive.)

Some normative cognitions are automatic and unconscious, while others are controlled and conscious. Researchers debate how the rules underlying a norm are stored in the mind, for instance, whether they are always internalized as explicit representations. Another academic discussion is about whether normative cognition is limited to specific mental domains. The alternative view suggests that it is associated with a general cognitive ability, making it relevant to most psychological processes. Psychologists further study what motivates normative behavior. Some proposals suggest intrinsic motivation, meaning that individuals uphold norms because they value a standard for its own sake. Others propose extrinsic motivation, arguing that the core motives come from external benefits associated with norm-guided behavior.

Evolutionary approaches seek to explain why normative cognition developed and how it confers adaptive advantages. Researchers typically focus on the pervasive social nature of humans and the role of norms in organizing and coordinating group behavior, resolving conflicts, and transmitting skills, such as tool use.

Developmental psychologists examine the natural tendency of humans to learn norms: by the ages of three to five, children typically grasp basic norms and also enforce them on others. Moral psychology, another subfield, focuses on the empirical investigation of moral norms and related phenomena, such as altruism, moral emotions, and virtues. Researchers also debate whether non-human animals are capable of normative cognition. Suggested examples include patterns of social conformity in chimpanzees and dominance hierarchies.

=== Sociology and anthropology ===
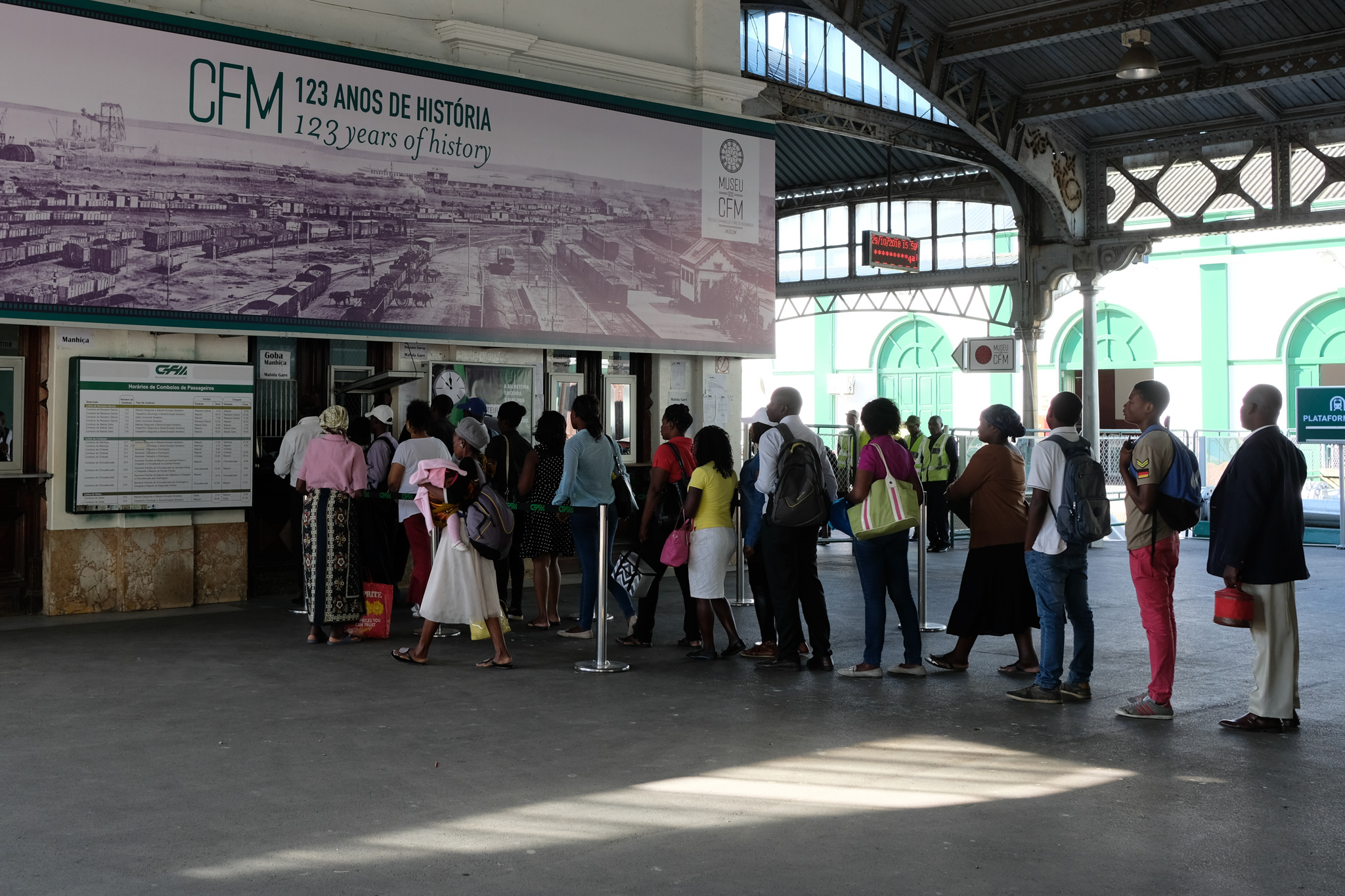
Social norms are rules about how to behave in social contexts, such as waiting in a line instead of cutting to the front.

Sociology and anthropology examine norms as in-group phenomena that reflect shared expectations and play a central role in communal life. Social norms are rules about how to behave in social contexts. Some encourage certain behaviors, like the injunction to be honest, whereas others discourage a particular conduct, like the prohibition against stealing. Social scientists distinguish norms from values since norms are typically enforced through material or symbolic punishments and rewards, such as fines or expressions of approval. They further differentiate norms from attitudes since norms are in-group phenomena that members widely accept, reflecting dominant attitudes shared by many individuals. Group acceptance and enforcement also distinguish norms from mere regularities of behavior. Researchers examine social norms on various levels, ranging from particular subcultures to entire societies. Some norms are enforced through centralized institutions, while others are maintained informally through interpersonal mechanisms.

Social norms play a role in many social sciences, and are of particular interest to anthropology and sociology. The exact characterization of norms varies with the field of inquiry. For example, cultural anthropologists emphasize the practical dimension, understanding norms as shared practices, while cognitive anthropologists focus on psychological aspects, characterizing norms as mental representations.

Social norms are found in every culture, but their exact content is historically contingent and differs from society to society, such as rules regarding sexual conduct prior to marriage. Despite the variability, researchers observe universal patterns for how norms are passed on to others, children in particular, as an aspect of socialization. These patterns include steady and consistent repetition to build habits, general evaluative assessments of the learner, and the use of strong emotions to enforce those habits, often negative ones through some form of punishment. Social norms can promote coordination within societies and make the behavior of others more predictable. However, not all norms are beneficial, and they can include harmful practices that discriminate against minorities or encourage dangerous behavior.

=== Linguistics ===
Linguistic norms are standards of language use, such as grammatical rules of how words may be combined to form sentences.

Linguistic norms are conventional patterns or standards of correctness about language use in a speech community. Some govern the right pronunciation of words, while others address grammatical rules of how words may be combined to form sentences. Semantic norms guide the associations of meanings with words and larger expressions. There are also context-dependent conventions about word choice, such as levels of formality when addressing superiors. Some norms apply to all speakers of a language, while others are only shared by specific subgroups, such as regional dialects. Localized conventions can mark group boundaries and reinforce group identity. Linguistic norms may change over time as communities evolve.

Some linguistic norms govern patterns that speakers naturally acquire and use, such as forming plurals in English with the suffix -s. Others are idealized patterns that may not reflect actual practice, like the traditional injunction against ending English sentences with a preposition. Norms also depend on the modality of communication. The standards of spoken language are more flexible, and ill-formed expressions may nonetheless be understood through shared context. The standards of written language, by contrast, are typically stricter, partly because a shared context is not always available to guide reader interpretation.

Native speakers learn and employ many norms effortlessly without being aware of the exact rules they are following. They can form correct expressions and detect deviations but may not be able to provide an explicit definition of the underlying rules. Accordingly, compliance with linguistic norms arises less from conscious or intentional rule-following and more from an implicit sensitivity shaped by habit and reactions to deviant behavior.

Since communicating ideas is a central aspect of language, one source of linguistic normativity comes from the goal of being understood by following established conventions. Several more specific theories of the underlying normative mechanisms have been suggested. One proposal, developed by John Searle, asserts that language is about communicating mental states, such as beliefs, desires, and intentions. According to this view, linguistic norms are required to make this possible.

=== Law ===
Normativity plays a central role in the field of law, governing the legal framework of institutional rules that regulate social behavior. Legal theorists and philosophers of law study the nature, authority, and justification of laws, examining how laws provide reasons for actions and how transgressions justify sanctions.

According to natural law theory, laws are meant to embody universal moral principles that reflect human nature. This view assumes that there is some kind of higher law—a natural or moral law—and holds that human-made laws are legitimate only insofar as they embody this natural law. Accordingly, the normative force of laws has its roots in moral standards that exist independently of any particular legal system, culture, or society.

Legal positivism, by contrast, understands laws as human conventions. It examines how laws are created, practiced, and applied to particular cases. On this view, laws are social or institutional facts that depend on the recognition and actions of the officials who implement them. Moral considerations can influence these processes, but legal positivists deny that they are an essential part. Accordingly, some laws may not be moral, and the legal question of whether a rule counts as a valid law is distinct from the moral question of whether the rule should be followed.

=== Other fields ===
Although economics is primarily a descriptive science of the production, distribution, and consumption of commodities, some of its areas deal with normative issues. Normative economics is a subfield dedicated to prescriptive analysis by examining ideals or standards of economic activities. One such standard is efficiency, which evaluates and compares economic arrangements based on the quantity of resources required to achieve a desired goal. Equity, another ideal, is about the distribution of costs and benefits, seeking to ensure an equal and fair treatment of all individuals engaged in economic activities. Normative economics includes welfare economics, which evaluates processes and policies based on their contribution to social well-being. Normative economics contrasts with positive economics, which focuses on empirical description and explanation of economic phenomena. (Note: Additionally, economists sometimes rely in their models on normative theories of decisions or rational choices, which discuss the norms of good or ideal decisions.)

In the field of medicine, standards of correctness govern the distinction between health and pathology. They can be understood as functional norms of how an organism and its parts should work. Philosophers of medicine debate whether the norms governing health and pathology can be grounded in scientific facts. According to naturalism, diseases, such as cancer, can be defined as biological dysfunctions in value-neutral terms. Normativists, by contrast, argue that diseases are essentially bad in some respect, meaning that only deviations with bad consequences, such as reduced well-being, count as diseases. A closely related view argues that the evaluative standards of good and bad or the distinction between health and pathology depend on social conventions that vary across times and cultures. For instance, homosexuality was historically considered a disease by medical professionals, a view that changed in the 20th century.

Neuroscientists study how brain processes produce normative cognitions. For example, they explore the brain areas and neural activities linked to the feeling of guilt after having done something wrong. They also compare responses associated with different types of normativity, like the contrast between social norms and moral imperatives.

While some fields of inquiry have normative phenomena as a topic, normativity is also relevant to descriptive sciences that investigate non-normative phenomena. One reason is that they adhere to standards distinguishing good from bad research. Accordingly, their theories and arguments are expected to satisfy principles such as internal coherence, validity, objectivity, empirical justification, and the scientific method.
