= Charles Beitz =

American political theorist (born 1949)

Charles R. Beitz
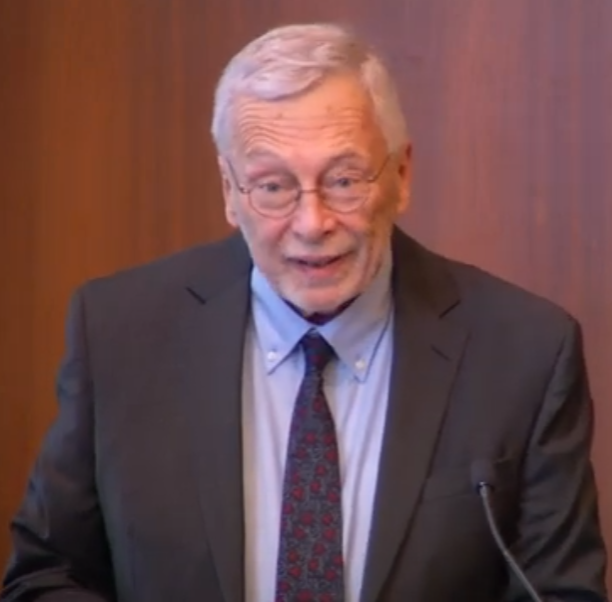
- Giving the 2022 Tanner Lecture at UC Berkeley
- Born: 1949 (age 76–77)
- Occupations: Academic, professor

Academic background
- Education: Colgate University (BA) University of Michigan (MA) Princeton University (MA, PhD)

Academic work
- Discipline: Political Scientist
- Institutions: Princeton University (2001–present) Bowdoin College Swarthmore College
- Main interests: Contemporary political thought, democratic theory, global political theory, theories of human rights, norms in international relations

Charles R. Beitz (born 1949) is an American political theorist known for his contributions to the field of global justice. He holds a Bachelor of Arts in history from Colgate University and advanced degrees in philosophy and politics from the University of Michigan and Princeton University. Beitz has held academic positions at Swarthmore College, Bowdoin College, and Princeton University, where he is currently the Edwards S. Sanford Professor of Politics. His work, particularly his 1979 book Political Theory and International Relations, has been highly influential in the literature on global justice. Beitz has received numerous fellowships, served as editor of Philosophy and Public Affairs, and was elected a Fellow of the American Academy of Arts and Sciences in 2008.

== Early life and education ==
Born in 1949, Beitz graduated summa cum laude with a Bachelor of Arts in history from Colgate University. He graduated with a master's degree in philosophy from the University of Michigan. He continued his education at Princeton University, graduating with a master's degree and a Ph.D. in politics and the Program in Political Philosophy. At Princeton, he studied under Dennis Thompson and Thomas Scanlon.

== Academia ==
Beitz's first academic post was at Swarthmore College, where taught from 1976 to 1991 and chaired the department of political science. He joined Bowdoin College in 1991 as dean for academic affairs and professor of government and legal studies. He returned to Princeton in 2001 as professor of politics and was appointed to the Edwards S. Sanford Chair in 2006. At Princeton, he has been director of graduate studies in the Politics Department and director of the University Center for Human Values.

He was editor of Philosophy and Public Affairs from 1999 to 2010 and now serves as an advisory editor. He has been a visiting scholar or professor at Harvard University, Columbia University, Oxford University, Stanford University, and New York University School of Law and has received fellowships from the Rockefeller Foundation, American Council of Learned Societies, MacArthur Foundation, American Council on Education, and Guggenheim Foundation. He was elected a Fellow of the American Academy of Arts and Sciences in 2008.

Beitz's work, along with that of Brian Barry, Thomas Pogge and Henry Shue, has been among the most important and influential in the literature concerning global justice. Of significant interest is his promotion of a cosmopolitan translation of John Rawls's Justice as Fairness domestic theory to the international sphere. His most significant work, his 1979 book Political Theory and International Relations, inspired a symposium in the journal Review of International Studies in 2005. Contributors to this journal edition include Chris Brown, David Miller, Simon Caney, Catherine Lu and Nicholas Rengger. His The Idea of Human Rights (2009) won the Estoril Global Issues Book Award in 2011 and was the subject of a symposium in Critical Review of International Social and Political Philosophy in 2022.

== Publications ==
=== Books ===
- Beitz, Charles R.; Goodin, Robert E. (2009). Global Basic Rights. Oxford: Oxford University Press.
- ——————— (2009). The Idea of Human Rights. Oxford: Oxford University Press. ISBN 978-0-19-957245-8.
- ——————— (1989). Political Equality: An Essay in Democratic Theory. Princeton: Princeton University Press. ISBN 978-0-691-07791-8.
- ——————— (1979). Political Theory and International Relations. Princeton: Princeton University Press. ISBN 978-0-691-07614-0.

=== Articles ===
- Beitz, Charles R. (2013). "Human Dignity in the Theory of Human Rights: Nothing But a Phrase?". Philosophy & Public Affairs. 41 (3): 259–290. doi:10.1111/papa.12017. ISSN 0048-3915.
- ——————— (2005). "Cosmopolitanism and Global Justice". The Journal of Ethics. 9 (1/2): 11–27. doi:10.1007/s10892-004-3312-0. ISSN 1382-4554. JSTOR 25115813.
- ——————— (2003). "What Human Rights Mean". Daedalus. 132 (1): 36–46. ISSN 0011-5266. JSTOR 20027821.
- ——————— (2001). "Does Global Inequality Matter?". Metaphilosophy. 32 (1/2): 95–112. doi:10.1111/1467-9973.00177. ISSN 0026-1068. JSTOR 24439453.
- ——————— (2001). "Human Rights as a Common Concern". The American Political Science Review. 95 (2): 269–282. doi:10.1017/S0003055401992019. ISSN 0003-0554. JSTOR 3118120.
- ——————— (2000). "Rawls's Law of Peoples". Ethics. 110 (4): 669–696. doi:10.1086/233369. ISSN 0014-1704.
- ——————— (1999). "Social and Cosmopolitan Liberalism". International Affairs. 75 (3): 515–529. doi:10.1111/1468-2346.00091. ISSN 0020-5850. JSTOR 2623634.
- ——————— (1975). "Justice and International Relations". Philosophy & Public Affairs. 4 (4): 360–389. ISSN 0048-3915. JSTOR 2265079.
