= Contractualism =

Moral theory

Contractualism as a broad term refers to a family of political or ethical theories that have their roots in the social contract tradition. Contractualist ethical theories base morality in mutually beneficial agreement or contract among rational, reasonable agents. Contractualism is sometimes referred to as the "third approach" in morality as opposed to its two prominent rivals, consequentialism and deontology. Contractualism in its narrower meaning refers to one particular branch of contractualist ethical theories developed by T. M. Scanlon.

== Contractualist philosophers ==
Throughout the history of political and ethical theories, many philosophers had views that more or less involved a notion of social contract. These philosophers include but are not limited to Thomas Hobbes (1651), Samuel Pufendorf (1673), John Locke (1689), Jean-Jacques Rousseau (1762), and Pierre-Joseph Proudhon (1851).

The main contractualist ethical theories that were developed in the 20th century include the theories of David Gauthier (1986), John Rawls (1971), and Thomas M. Scanlon (1982).

=== Rawls ===
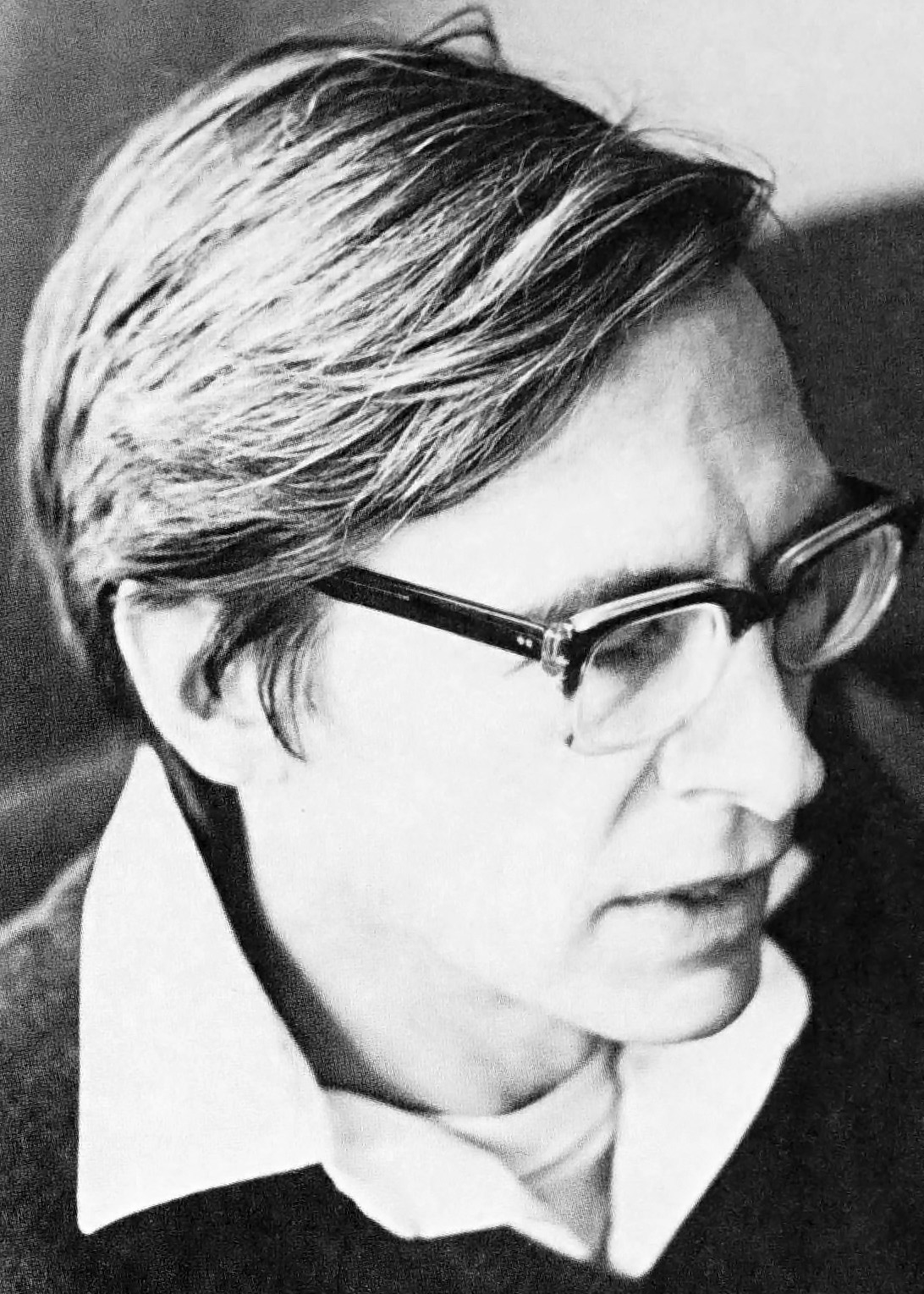
Photo portrait of philosopher John Rawls -1971

Contractualism as an alternative account to utilitarianism was first proposed by John Rawls in his book A Theory of Justice (1971), where he defines justice as fairness with an emphasis on impartiality. He discusses that the principles of justice are principles that would be accepted by self-interested but reasonable agents from an original position (an initial position in society where everyone is equal, and decisions are made from behind a "veil of ignorance" where no one knows what roles or status they will end up having in the society). While Rawls's contractualism is mainly a political theory, according to himself, it can be used to develop a moral contractualist theory called "rightness as fairness", suggesting that everyone should follow the principles that their universal acceptance would be accepted from a rational, impartial standpoint.

=== Scanlon ===
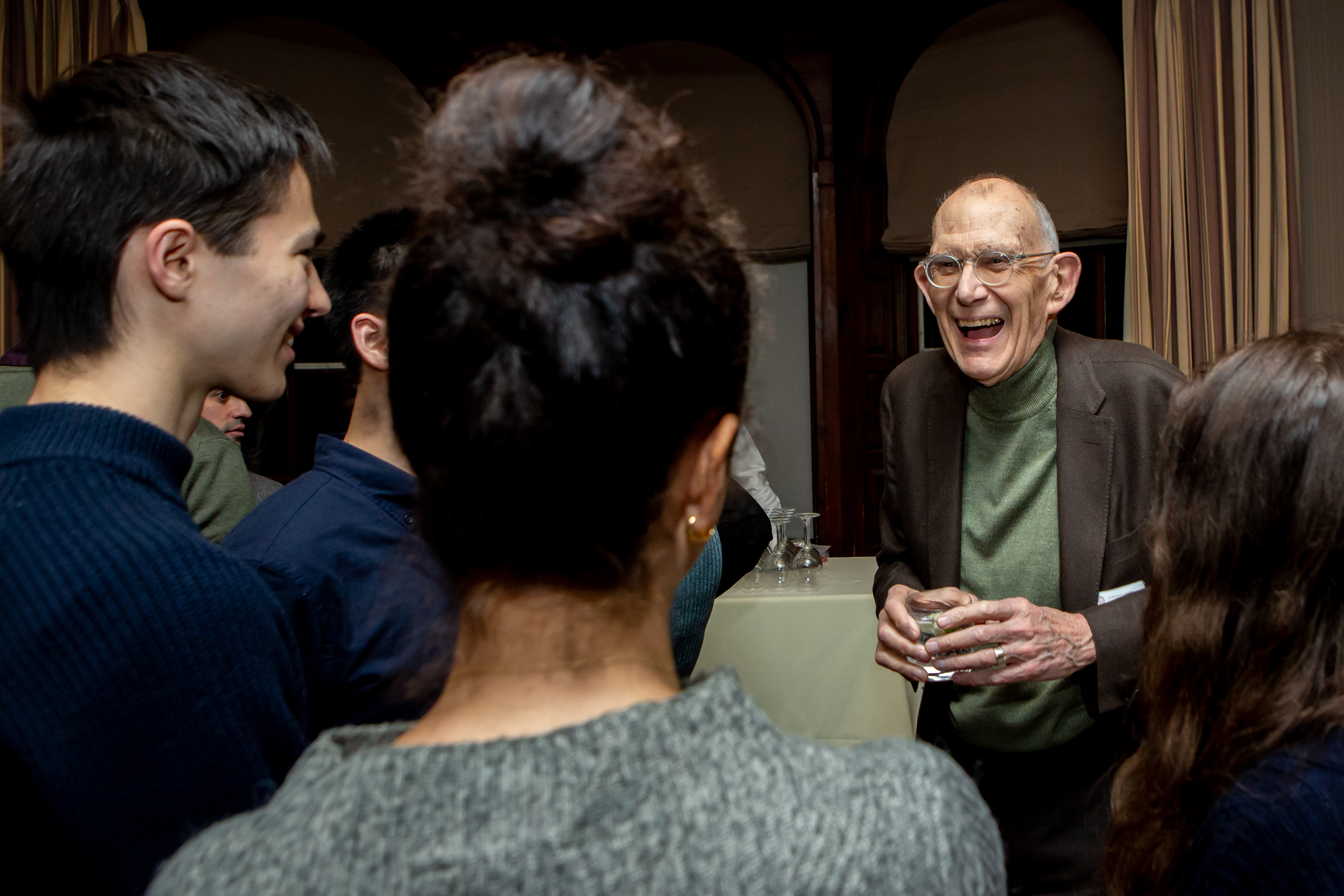
T. M. Scanlon on the right at the Edmond J. Safra Center for Ethics.

Thomas M. Scanlon proposes contractualism as a better alternative to utilitarianism in a book chapter titled "Contractualism and Utilitarianism" (1982) and later developed his theory further in his book What We Owe to Each Other (1998). According to Scanlon, an action is morally permissible if it is justifiable based on agreements among parties that are affected by that action.

As Scanlon explains, unlike Rawls, his contractualism as an account of morality does not involve making a decision from an original position and behind the veil of ignorance. Scanlon acknowledges that involved agents might have different goals and interests, and therefore, impartiality is no longer central in his view. Rather, he mainly focuses on justifiability of an action given the specific circumstances around it, including the agents with partial interests.

=== Gauthier ===
David Gauthier's contractarianism is centered around individual rationales. He proposes that everyone, in the long term, will be better off if they cooperate. Even if one only cares about their own self-interest, it is more beneficial for them to consider others' interests as well. Because otherwise, if they maximize their own gains without considering how their action minimizes others' gains, they will eventually get excluded from cooperative opportunities. Therefore, a "constrained maximizer" benefits them better than "straightforward maximizers". As a Hobbesian contractarian, Gauthier's morality is based on mutually benefited cooperation among rational agents with mainly self-interested motivations. This contrasts with the Kantian contractualists' views that base morality on agreed-upon contracts among agents that are reasonable and respectful of others' interests and try to be either impartial (Rawls's view) or justify their actions to others (Scanlon).

== Contractualism vs. utilitarianism ==
As explained, contractualism as an ethical theory was first proposed to become a better alternative to utilitarianism. Similar to utilitarianism, contractualism aims to be impartial and considers aspects of the consequences of an action, but it is not completely consequence-based like utilitarianism.

Utilitarianism grounds morality on wellbeing and suffering. However, contractualism goes beyond wellbeing and offers a broader and stronger (according to Scanlon) source of moral motivation than sympathy and caring for the wellbeing of others: Justifying actions to others on the bases that no one could reasonably reject. According to Scanlon, this is a very strong moral motivation and people go a long way to prove that their actions are justified, and even when they fail, it is not because their motivation to justify their action was weak, but rather due to deceiving themselves and putting more weight on their own interests. Contractualism can still consider well-being and explains why it is morally significant, but it would not be the only fundamental criterion for morality, and contractualism has room to include other factors besides wellbeing into its reasoning and justification. In that sense, contractualism does not necessarily refute other ethical frameworks. Within any of the other ethical frameworks, people would still want to justify their actions according to bases that are proposed by the ethical theory they believe is the best.

Contractualism also addresses the problems with aggregating utility that utilitarianism faces. Scanlon argues that philosophical utilitarianism, with its focus on well-being, attracts much attention and is very appealing to people due to sympathy. However, when it comes to normative utilitarianism, i.e., the standards that should guide moral actions, it becomes very complicated because of the problems with aggregating wellbeing. For example, reducing the suffering of a few people might be counted as similar to slightly increasing the wellbeing of a vast majority of people. This is different than our notion of sympathy, which is typically towards an individual, which, according to utilitarians, is partially biased and therefore problematic. Another problem is whether the benefit to wellbeing should be direct (act-utilitarianism) or indirect (rule-utilitarianism). Contractualism, on the contrary, does not rely on complicated and controversial calculations, by accounting for the fact that people have subjective goals and interests and they reason from individual standpoints, but this does not mean they are not impartial. Because people are motivated to justify their actions to others, they still need to be respectful of others' needs and goals, and they are expected to weigh their own interests and other people's interests reasonably.

Finally, contractualism and utilitarianism are different in their scope. While Scanlon argues that contractualism offers a broader scope than utilitarianism because moral motivation goes beyond wellbeing and includes other factors into the reasoning, critiques of contractualism point out how contractualism can be narrower in scope because it only applies to "what we owe to each other" and whatever that is relevant among the contracting parties. Therefore, extending moral relevance beyond the mutually benefited parties (such as animals or future people) becomes very hard to defend within contractualism.

== Contractualism vs. deontology ==
Contractualism can be considered a deontological framework, and like all other non-consequentialist theories, including Kantian ethics, contractualism is based on moral principles with a global scope rather than the consequences specific to a condition. In fact, Scanlon's and Rawls's versions of contractualism, for example, are categorized as Kantian contractualism because of the many similarities they share with Kantian ideas. For example, Rawls aimed to find principles that everyone would agree on from an impartial standpoint, which parallels the notion of Kant's universalizability. Besides the similarities between Kantian deontology and contractualism, there are some aspects in which contractualism—and Scanlon's contractualism in particular—is different.

One aspect is the way they define wrongness and rightness. In Kantian ethics, moral rightness is defined as principles that everyone would agree on. Scanlon's contractualism focuses on wrongness instead of establishing rightness and defines wrongness as not justified. With this approach, rightness is defined as not being wrong. This provides more flexibility with the principles, because instead of aiming to establish rightness, it reasons why a principle is not wrong. This also makes it possible for contractualism to include certain aspects of the situation (including possible outcomes, intentions, and goals) into its reasoning, whereas the situation considered in Kantian ethics is an abstract idealized condition, which is far from reality.

== Criticism ==
Contractualism is critiqued for being dependent on the existence of contracting parties. This restrains the scope of morality to only the people who are, or could potentially be a part of the mutually beneficial agreement. Therefore, other entities, such as animals or nature, fall outside the domain of moral relevance within contractualism. Similarly, people who will live in the future cannot possibly be in a mutually beneficial agreement with the people living now. By contrast, utilitarianism can easily defend the moral relevance of non-human entities or future generations by relying on the objective value of aggregate well-being. Another criticism of contractualism, which is more related to its logical structure, is the redundancy or circularity of reasonable rejection. According to contractualism, an action is wrong if it is not justifiable under the principles that no one can reasonably reject. On the other hand, principles that would allow an action that is wrong can reasonably be rejected, creating a circular loop between wrong actions and unjustifiable principles.

== Descriptive accounts ==
Contractualist ethical theories are not limited to normative ethics (concerned with the question of how moral behavior should be). Inspired by philosophical theories described above (such as Scanlon's contractualism), psychologists and behavioral scientists have developed descriptive accounts (concerned with the question of how moral behavior is) of humans' moral cognition and behavior that are in line with the contractualist framework.

=== Evolutionary perspective ===
Jean-Baptiste André, Nicolas Baumard, and colleagues (2023), among others, provide an evolutionary explanation of human morality that is consistent with contractualism and explains how evolution and natural selection have adapted human minds to consider the social contract and benefits of others. According to this account, the human species has evolved to value reciprocity and cooperation, and people who are more cooperative have a higher chance of being selected by others. Therefore, people are often under pressure to give signals that they are cooperative and cooperation with them is worthwhile. In other words, they benefit from having a good reputation in the long term, and the best way to signal that one is a cooperative person is to actually be cooperative. However, cooperation often comes at the cost of their immediate gain. Therefore, in every social interaction, people face a trade-off between maximizing their own immediate benefit and maximizing the benefit of others and hence their own long-term reputation. The Nash bargaining (maximizing the product of my gain and the other person's gain in a two-person bargaining interaction) offers a solution. With that, the human mind is used to doing these calculations that involve not only their own benefit and opportunity cost but also others' benefits and opportunity costs. With this view, moral duties (such as Kantian moral rules) are behaviors that would be in line with these calculations, and morally wrong behavior, are those that fail to result in a maximally beneficial solution.

=== Psychological contractualism ===
If we adopt the contractualist evolutionary explanation of morality, the next questions concern how people are, in practice, contractualist, and which cognitive mechanisms enable them to identify social contracts and judge which behaviors are morally right or wrong. To answer these questions, Sydney Levin, Nick Chater, and their colleagues (2024) propose the resource-rational contractualism theory of moral cognition. According to this theory, the goal of morality is to get along and come to agreements over problems by talking and negotiating. However, these agreements are not always available to us, because we don't have the time or the access to talk to all the people, and our resources are limited. Therefore, we use heuristics and strategies to make guesses and abstractions on what the agreement would be, and we try to approximate them. With this approach, the other ethical frameworks and elements of our moral mind (utilitarianism and deontology) could also be explained in part as heuristics for approximating the mutually beneficial contracts.
