= Reason (argument) =

Consideration which justifies or explains

In general terms, a reason is a consideration in an argument that justifies or explains an action, belief, attitude, or fact. A reason, in many cases, is brought up by the question "why?" and is answered following the word because. Additionally, words and phrases such as since, due to, as, a result of, considering (that), and in order (to), for example, all serve as explanatory locutions that precede the reason to which they refer.

Normative reasons are appealed to when arguments are made about what one should do or believe. For example, that a doctor's patient is grimacing is a reason to believe that the patient is in pain. That the patient is in pain is a reason for the doctor to take action to alleviate this pain. Explanatory reasons are explanations of why things happened. For example, the reason that the patient is in pain is that their nerves are sending signals from their tissues to their brain.

== Types of reason ==
In philosophy, it is common to distinguish between three kinds of reason.

Normative or justifying reasons are often said to be "considerations which count in favor" of some state of affairs (this is, at any rate, a common view, notably held by T. M. Scanlon and Derek Parfit).

Explanatory reasons are considerations which serve to explain why things have happened or why states of affairs are the way they are. In other words, "reason" can also be a synonym for "cause". For example, a reason a car starts is that its ignition is turned. In the context of explaining the actions of beings who act for reasons (i.e., rational agents), these are called motivating reasons—e.g., the reason Bill went to college was to learn; i.e., that he would learn was his motivating reason. At least where a rational agent is acting rationally, her motivating reasons are those considerations which she believes count in favor of her so acting.

Joshua Gert distinguishes within motivating reasons for a distinction between a reason's requiring strength and its justifying strength. He views these as giving two dimensions of normative strength, namely that of the requiring strength of a reason to render rationally required an action otherwise not rationally required and that of the justifying strength of a reason to justify the rational permissibility of an action otherwise rationally impermissible. As he writes, "[t]he domain of actions can be partitioned into two sets: the rationally permissible, and the irrational. A change in status must be from one of these to the other." As an example, consider the example of an employee who could, by losing a finger, save the company he works for a few million dollars. The reason "in order to save the company a few million dollars" would have sufficient justifying strength for the rational permissibility of sacrificing the finger, yet would not have sufficient requiring strength to make it rationally required.

== Normative reasons ==
Some philosophers (one being John Broome) view normative reasons as the same as "explanations of ought facts". Just as explanatory reasons explain why some descriptive fact obtains (or came to obtain), normative reasons on this view explain why some normative facts obtain, i.e., they explain why some state of affairs ought to come to obtain (e.g., why someone should act or why some event ought to take place).

=== Epistemic versus practical reasons ===
Philosophers, when discussing reasoning that is influenced by norms, commonly make a distinction between theoretical reason and practical reason. These are capacities that draw on epistemic reasons (matters of fact and of explanation) or practical reasons (reasons for action) respectively. Epistemic reasons (also called theoretical or evidential reasons) are considerations which count in favor of believing some proposition to be true. Practical reasons are considerations which count in favor of some action or the having of some attitude (or at least, count in favor of wanting or trying to bring those actions or attitudes about).

==== Epistemic reasons in argumentation ====
In informal logic, a reason consists of either a single premise or co-premises in support of an argument. In formal symbolic logic, only single premises occur. In informal reasoning, two types of reasons exist. An evidential reason is a foundation upon which to believe that or why a claim is true. An explanatory reason attempts to convince someone how something is or could be true, but does not directly convince one that it is true.

== See also ==
- Is-ought problem
- Normative
- Positive statement
- Four causes
