= Jonathan Wolff (philosopher) =

British political philosopher (born 1959)

Jonathan Wolff FBA
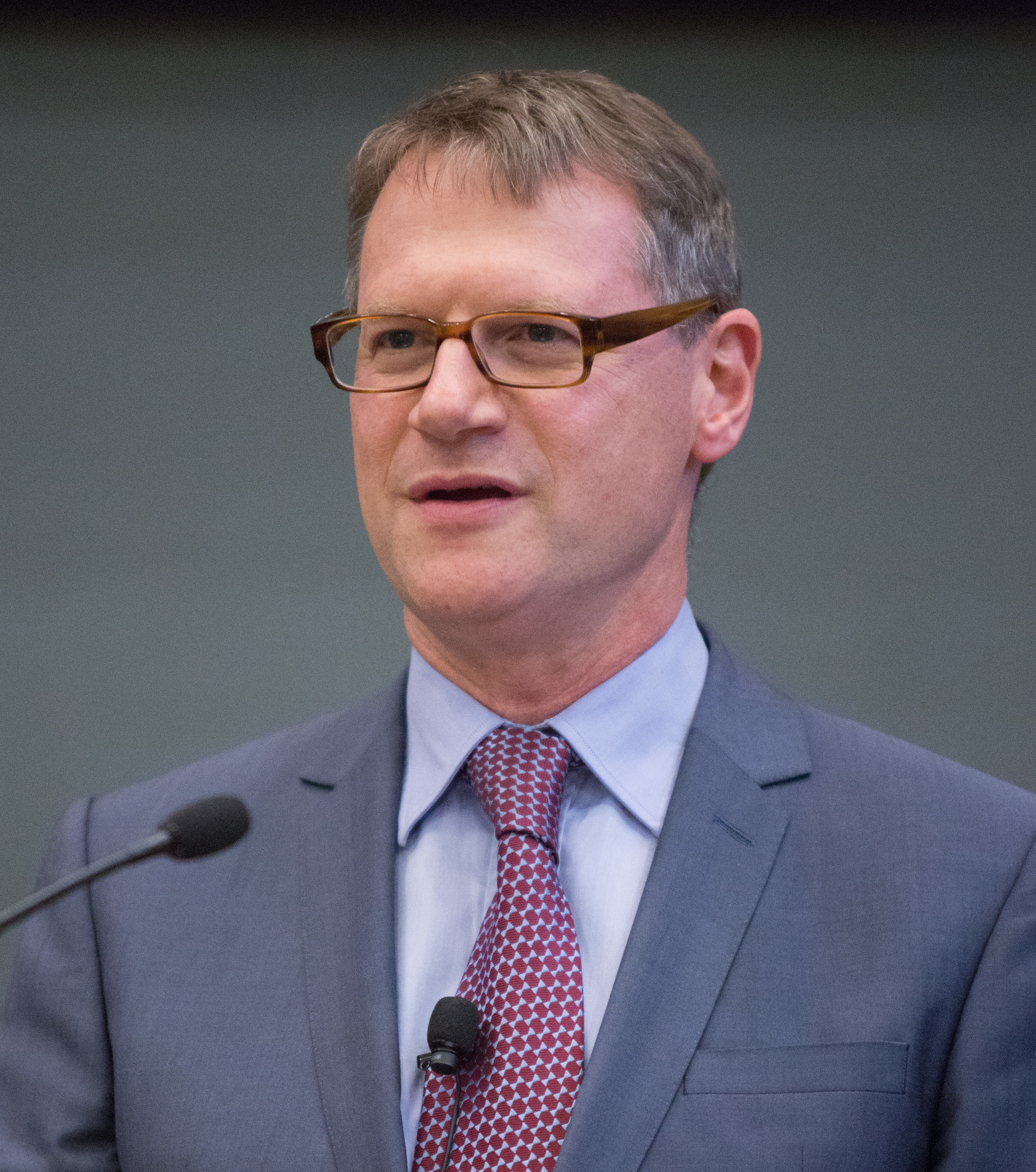
- Wolff in 2012
- Born: 25 June 1959 (age 67)

Academic background
- Education: University College, London
- Academic advisor: G. A. Cohen

Academic work
- Discipline: Philosophy
- Sub-discipline: Political philosophy
- School or tradition: Analytic philosophy
- Institutions: University College, London; Wolfson College, Oxford

Jonathan Wolff (born 25 June 1959) is a British philosopher. He is Emeritus Alfred Landecker Professor of Values and Public Policy at the Blavatnik School of Government at the University of Oxford and Emeritus Governing Body Fellow at Wolfson College, Oxford. Prior to his joining the Blavatnik School in 2016, Wolff's academic career had been spent at University College London (UCL), where he was, latterly, Professor of Philosophy and Dean of the Faculty of Arts and Humanities.

== Life and career ==
Wolff was born on 25 June 1959 to Herbert Wolff and Doris Wolff (née Polakoff). He earned his Master of Philosophy from UCL under the direction of G. A. Cohen in 1985. Following a year spent as a Harkness Fellow at Harvard University, he taught at UCL thereafter until 2016, ending his career there as Professor of Philosophy and Dean of the Faculty of Arts and Humanities. From 2016 until 2020, he held the Blavatnik Chair in Public Policy in the Blavatnik School of Government at Oxford University. He was then Alfred Landecker Professor of Values and Public Policy at the same school. He is, as of autumn 2024, Senior Research Fellow in Philosophy and Public Policy and Governing Body Fellow at Wolfson College, Oxford.

Since 2023 he has been the president of the Royal Institute of Philosophy. He was formerly the secretary of the British Philosophical Association and has been Editor and then honorary secretary of the Aristotelian Society, which publishes Proceedings of the Aristotelian Society. Recently, Wolff's work has specialised in disadvantage and equality and public policy decision making.

As a scholar on the topic of Marxism, Wolff published "Marx and Exploitation", an article about Marxist thinking, in The Journal of Ethics. He also co-edited (with Michael Rosen) Political Thought, an introductory reader on political philosophy.

He has also published a general overviews of the debate around Robert Nozick's Anarchy, State, and Utopia called Robert Nozick: Property, Justice and the Minimal State, a short book on Karl Marx, Why Read Marx Today?, and An Introduction to Political Philosophy. He also wrote a regular column on higher education for The Guardian for several years.

Jonathan Wolff presented a four-part series about the UK's National Health Service (NHS) for the BBC's Radio 3 programme The Essay during the week of 27 July 2009. The series, entitled "Doctoring Philosophy", marked the 60th anniversary of the NHS and commenced by studying the philosophical background which led to the foundation of the service and the changing definitions of sickness and health. It went on to explore entitlement, issues of equality of service, and issues of priorities in a world of universal access.

He was a member of the Nuffield Council on Bioethics (2008–2014) and served on two of the council's working parties; on the ethics of animal research, and the ethics of personalised healthcare.

Wolff was elected a Fellow of the British Academy in 2023.

== Works ==
Books

- Robert Nozick: Property, Justice and the Minimal State. Oxford: Polity in association with Basil Blackwell. 1991. ISBN 978-0-7456-0603-3.
- An Introduction to Political Philosophy (3rd ed.). Oxford Oxfordshire: Oxford University Press. 2015. ISBN 9780199658015.
- with Rosen, Michael (1999). Political Thought. Oxford Oxfordshire: Oxford University Press. ISBN 978-0-19-289278-2.
- Why Read Marx Today?. Oxford Oxfordshire: Oxford University Press. 2002. ISBN 978-0-19-280335-1.
- with de Shalit', Avner (2007). Disadvantage. New York: Oxford University Press. ISBN 978-0-19-927826-8.
- Ethics and Public Policy: A Philosophical Inquiry. Abingdon: Routledge. 2011. ISBN 9780415668538.
- The Human Right to Health. New York: W.W. Norton & Company. 2012. ISBN 978-0-393-07900-5.

Journal articles

- Wolff, Jonathan (December 2003). "Scanlon on well-being". Ratio. 16 (4): 332–345. doi:10.1046/j.1467-9329.2003.00227.x.

See also: Scanlon, T.M. (December 2003). "Replies". Ratio. 16 (4): 424–439. doi:10.1046/j.1467-9329.2003.00231.x.

== See also ==
- G. A. Cohen
