= Norm (philosophy) =

Sentences used to effect an action

Norms, in philosophy, are concepts (sentences) of practical import, oriented to affecting an action, rather than conceptual abstractions that describe, explain, and express. Normative sentences imply "ought-to" (or "may", "may not") types of statements and assertions, in distinction to sentences that provide "is" (or "was", "will") types of statements and assertions. Common normative sentences include commands, permissions, and prohibitions; common normative abstract concepts include sincerity, justification, and honesty. A popular account of norms describes them as reasons to take action, to believe, and to feel.

== Types of norms ==
Orders and permissions express norms. Such norm sentences do not describe how the world is, they rather prescribe how the world should be. Imperative sentences are the most obvious way to express norms, but declarative sentences also may be norms, as is the case with laws or 'principles'. Generally, whether an expression is a norm depends on what the sentence intends to assert. For instance, a sentence of the form "All Ravens are Black" could on one account be taken as descriptive, in which case an instance of a white raven would contradict it, or alternatively "All Ravens are Black" could be interpreted as a norm, in which case it stands as a principle and definition, so 'a white raven' would then not be a raven.

Those norms purporting to create obligations (or duties) and permissions are called deontic norms (see also deontic logic). The concept of deontic norm is already an extension of a previous concept of norm, which would only include imperatives, that is, norms purporting to create duties. The understanding that permissions are norms in the same way was an important step in ethics and philosophy of law.

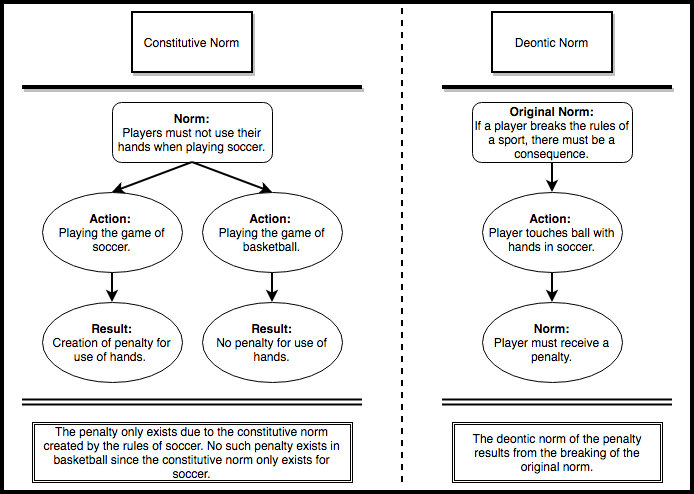
A flowchart with examples of constitutive and deontic norms

In addition to deontic norms, many other varieties have been identified. For instance, some constitutions establish the national anthem. These norms do not directly create any duty or permission. They create a "national symbol". Other norms create nations themselves or political and administrative regions within a nation. The action orientation of such norms is less obvious than in the case of a command or permission, but is essential for understanding the relevance of issuing such norms: When a folk song becomes a "national anthem" the meaning of singing one and the same song changes; likewise, when a piece of land becomes an administrative region, this has legal consequences for many activities taking place on that territory; and without these consequences concerning action, the norms would be irrelevant. A more obviously action-oriented variety of such constitutive norms (as opposed to deontic or regulatory norms) establishes social institutions which give rise to new, previously nonexistent types of actions or activities (a standard example is the institution of marriage without which "getting married" would not be a feasible action; another is the rules constituting a game: without the norms of soccer, there would not exist such an action as executing an indirect free kick).

Any convention can create a norm, although the relation between both is not settled.

There is a significant discussion about (legal) norms that give someone the power to create other norms. They are called power-conferring norms or norms of competence. Some authors argue that they are still deontic norms, while others argue for a close connection between them and institutional facts (see Raz 1975, Ruiter 1993).

Linguistic conventions, for example, the convention in English that "cat" means cat or the convention in Portuguese that "gato" means cat, are among the most important norms.

Games completely depend on norms. The fundamental norm of many games is the norm establishing who wins and loses. In other games, it is the norm establishing how to score points.

Norms can be defined as rules that regulate one's social life within a particular group. Within such, there can be explicit and implicit laws that help enforce norms. For example, explicit laws bring reward and punishment, such as cheating. Implicit cultural conventions include blocking the top of the stairs on a subway, doing your makeup on the train, or even walking slowly in the city. Norms can be described as injunctive social norms or descriptive social norms. Injunctive social norms are norms agreed upon mental representation of what a group of people think. An example of such can include being kind to your parents, or giving up the seat for a pregnant lady on the bus. These all showcase what some people feel should be done. Descriptive social norms on the other hand are norms agreed upon mental representations of what a group of people actually think or feel. An example of such can include drinking in public. Although we know it should not take place, on the back of our mind we know it happens. Another example can even include jaywalking. This shows that there are actual laws of what shouldn't occur, yet it still does.

In society, there are many norms of reciprocity: door in the face, foot in the door, etc. One of the most common uses by people is door in the face. As human beings, we want to be liked by others and feel wanted. It is simply just human nature. This strategy uses reciprocating concessions to influence one's behavior. This norm of reciprocity includes asking someone for something big, which we know the likelihood of the answer will be no. You would then ask them for something smaller and they would be more likely to say yes. For example, if I ask a group of people for $100, they are not likely to give it to me. However, if I turn around again and ask for $5, they are more likely to give it to me.

Many psychologists have done experiments to show the power of social learning and the influence it has on social norms to behavior. In 1961, Bandura studied to see if social behaviors can be gained from observation and imitation. 36 boys and 36 girls studied at the Stanford University Nursing School. Before the experiment was done, researchers wanted to see how aggressive they were on average on a scale of 1 to 5. Then, the overall 72 students were assigned to one of three groups. One group was assigned with the control group- no model, one group was assigned with an aggressive role model, and the other group was assigned with a non-aggressive role model. They then viewed a female model and a male model of each. The children were then placed independently into the room and were given aggressive/non-aggressive toys. The non-aggressive toys included a tea set, crayons, and three bears. The aggressive toys included a peg board, a dart gun, and a 3-foot bobo doll. The child was in the room for twenty minutes and was observed through a one way mirror. Observations were made every 5 seconds during the duration of 20 minutes. The researchers had found that children who had seen the aggressive model had aggressive responses compared to people that were in the non-aggression or control group. The boys were also more likely to imitate the behavior of the same sex models rather than the girls showing more violent behavior. The girls also acted more violently to the male models. These findings relate to norms as they show the influence of social norms on behavior. The young children were more likely to observe and copy the norms and be influenced by the behavior of others, especially those they may see as “older” or a “role model.”

In recent years, research has opened up on the hypothesis that non-human animals are also capable of acting according to norms. This thesis, supported by various philosophers and ethologists, is the subject of a current debate that is primarily based on the distinction between different possible concepts of ‘norm’.

== Major characteristics ==
One major characteristic of norms is that, unlike propositions, they are not descriptively true or false, since norms do not purport to describe anything, but to prescribe, create or change something. Deontologists would denote them to be "prescriptively true" or false. Whereas the truth of a descriptive statement is purportedly based on its correspondence to reality, some philosophers, beginning with Aristotle, assert that the (prescriptive) truth of a prescriptive statement is based on its correspondence to right desire. Other philosophers maintain that norms are ultimately neither true or false, but only successful or unsuccessful (valid or invalid), as their propositional content obtains or not (see also John Searle and speech act).

There is an important difference between norms and normative propositions, although they are often expressed by identical sentences. "You may go out" usually expresses a norm if it is uttered by the teacher to one of the students, but it usually expresses a normative proposition if it is uttered to one of the students by one of his or her classmates. Some ethical theories reject that there can be normative propositions, but these are accepted by cognitivism. One can also think of propositional norms; assertions and questions arguably express propositional norms (they set a proposition as asserted or questioned).

Another purported feature of norms, it is often argued, is that they never regard only natural properties or entities. Norms always bring something artificial, conventional, institutional or "unworldly". This might be related to Hume's assertion that it is not possible to derive ought from is and to G.E. Moore's claim that there is a naturalistic fallacy when one tries to analyse "good" and "bad" in terms of a natural concept. In aesthetics, it has also been argued that it is impossible to derive an aesthetical predicate from a non-aesthetical one. The acceptability of non-natural properties, however, is strongly debated in present-day philosophy. Some authors deny their existence, some others try to reduce them to natural ones, on which the former supervene.

Other thinkers (Adler, 1986) assert that norms can be natural in a different sense than that of "corresponding to something proceeding from the object of the prescription as a strictly internal source of action". Rather, those who assert the existence of natural prescriptions say norms can suit a natural need on the part of the prescribed entity. More to the point, however, is the putting forward of the notion that just as descriptive statements being considered true are conditioned upon certain self-evident descriptive truths suiting the nature of reality (such as: it is impossible for the same thing to be and not be at the same time and in the same manner), a prescriptive truth can suit the nature of the will through the authority of it being based upon self-evident prescriptive truths (such as: one ought to desire what is really good for one and nothing else).

Recent works maintain that normativity has an important role in several different philosophical subjects, not only in ethics and philosophy of law (see Dancy, 2000).

== See also ==
- Constitution
- Deontic logic
- Deontology
- Law (principle)
- Meta-ethics
- Norm (sociology)
- Normative
- Normative ethics
- Normative statement
- Philosophy of law
- Principle
- Law
- Rule of law
- Rule according to higher law
- Social norm
- Speech act
