= T. M. Scanlon =

American philosopher (born 1940)

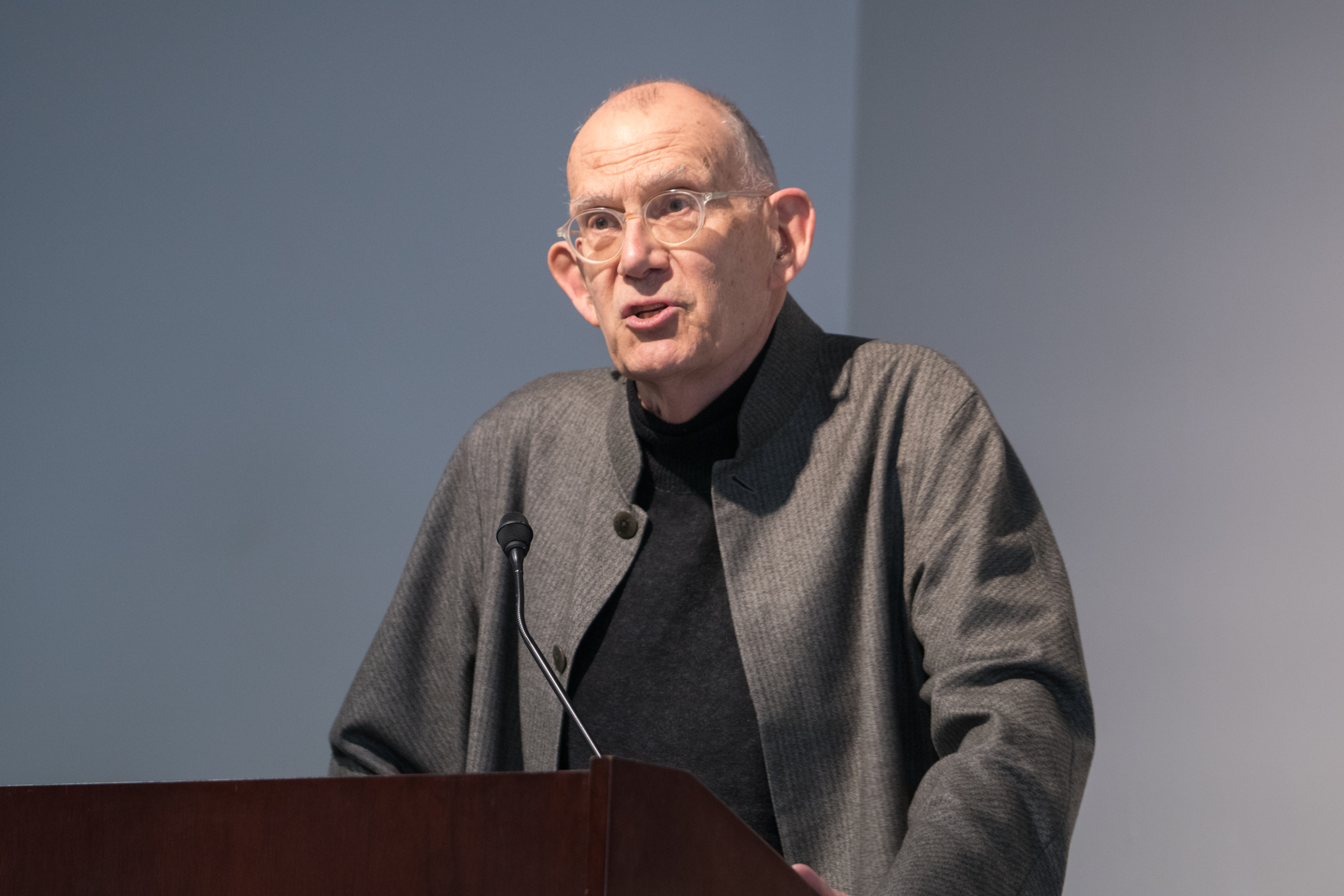
- Scanlon in 2018
- Born: Thomas Michael Scanlon; June 28, 1940 (age 86)
- Other name: Tim Scanlon
- Relatives: Tommie Shelby (son-in-law)

Education
- Education: Princeton University; Brasenose College, Oxford; Harvard University
- Doctoral advisor: Burton Dreben
- Other advisor: John Rawls

Philosophical work
- Era: Contemporary philosophy
- Region: Western philosophy
- School: Analytic philosophy; Contractualism
- Institutions: Princeton University; Harvard University
- Notable students: Michael N. Forster
- Main interests: Ethics; political philosophy
- Notable ideas: Reasons fundamentalism

Thomas Michael "Tim" Scanlon (/ˈskænlən/; born June 28, 1940) is an American philosopher. At the time of his retirement in 2016, he was the Alford Professor of Natural Religion, Moral Philosophy, and Civil Polity in Harvard University's Department of Philosophy, where he had taught since 1984. He was elected to the American Philosophical Society in 2018.

== Life and career ==
Scanlon was born on June 28, 1940, and grew up in Indianapolis, Indiana. He obtained his undergraduate degree from Princeton University in 1962; earned his PhD in philosophy from Harvard under Burton Dreben in 1968; studied for a year at Oxford University on a Fulbright Scholarship; and returned to Princeton, where he taught from 1966 until 1984. He was made a MacArthur Fellow in 1993.

His teaching in the department has included courses on theories of justice, equality, and recent ethical theory. His book What We Owe to Each Other was published by Harvard University Press in 1998; a collection of papers on political theory, The Difficulty of Tolerance, was published by Cambridge University Press in 2003.

Scanlon is the father-in-law of philosopher and African-American studies scholar Tommie Shelby.

== Philosophical work ==
Scanlon's dissertation and some of his first papers were in mathematical logic, where his main concern was in proof theory, but he turned to ethics and political philosophy, where he developed a version of contractualism in the line of John Rawls, Immanuel Kant, and Jean-Jacques Rousseau. Scanlon has also published important work on freedom of speech, equality, tolerance, foundations of contract law, human rights, conceptions of welfare, and theories of justice, as well as on foundational questions in moral theory.

=== Contractualism ===
Contractualism is a constructivist attempt at providing a unified account of the subject matter of a central part of morality that Scanlon calls "what we owe to each other". The normative domain of what we owe to each other is meant to encompass those duties to other people we bear in virtue of their standing as rational creatures. A broader conception of morality includes whatever else we may owe specific people, such as the special obligations we bear in relations with friends and family, or whatever else morality may require of us, such as the way in which we treat ourselves or nature. Scanlon believes that what we owe to each other, or what we could loosely call "the morality of right and wrong", is distinct from this broader conception of morality in that contractualism provides a unified account of its content.

In this form of contractualism, judgments about right and wrong, unlike empirical judgments, are not theoretical claims about the nature of the spatiotemporal world but rather practical claims about what we have reason to do. Further, they are a particularly important class of practical claims in that the judgment that an action is wrong is made to provide reasons not to do that action that are most often considered decisive against competing reasons. Following this point, Scanlon takes questions about the reason-giving force of moral judgments to be prior to questions about the subject matter of the morality of right and wrong. More explicitly, he thinks that if we provide an account of the extraordinary reason-giving force of moral judgments, then this account could largely form the basis for a characterization of the subject matter of what we owe to each other.

Scanlon grounds the reason-giving force of judgments about right and wrong in "the positive value of a way of living with others". This way of living with others is typified by an ideal of mutual recognition between rational agents, where mutual recognition demands that moral agents acknowledge the value of human life and respond to this value in the right ways.

On the question of how we ought to value human, or rational, life, Scanlon argues that different valuable things require different ways of valuing. In contrast to teleological accounts of value, often to take something to be of value is not only to see reason to bring about a maximal amount of that thing. This is especially true of the value of human life. When we value human life, he writes, we do not see this as a reason to create as much human life as we can. Rather, we tend to see reason to respect other human beings, to protect them from death and other forms of harm and, in general, to want their lives to go well. More important for Scanlon, to value rational life is to recognize the features that distinguish rational life from other valuable things, specifically, rational creatures' ability to assess reasons and judgments and to govern their lives in accordance with these assessments. Scanlon asserts that the proper response to the recognition of these distinctive features is to treat rational creatures in terms of principles they could not reasonably reject.

From this point, Scanlon's account of the value of rational life provides a focus around which his account of the reason-giving force of moral judgments dovetails neatly with a characterization of the method of reasoning we use to arrive at judgments of right and wrong—a method, moreover, that seems phenomenologically plausible. The reason-giving force of moral judgments is grounded in an ideal of mutual recognition that requires treating others in accordance with principles they could not reasonably reject. Because mutual recognition requires that these other people are also appropriately motivated, this entails Scanlon's formulation of wrongness: "An act is wrong if and only if any principle that permitted it would be one that could reasonably be rejected by people moved to find principles for the general regulation of behavior that others, similarly motivated, could not reasonably reject". An act is right, quite simply, if a principle permitting it could not reasonably be rejected in terms of this contractualist formulation.

Regarding how moral principles are derived from the contractualist formulation, when considering whether a principle can be rejected we must take into account the consequences, in general, of its being accepted, not only the consequences of the particular actions that it allows. Because we cannot be sure who will be affected by a principle or how they will be affected, we must draw on our experience of life and consider the "generic reasons" people are likely to have, as a result of their general circumstances, to reject a principle. In order to determine whether a principle is reasonably rejectable, we must impartially weigh these generic reasons against each other, and exercising our judgement, draw a conclusion about what the weight of reasons support. Given the motivation of finding principles for the general regulation of society that no one could reasonably reject, if the weight of reasons support a certain conclusion, it would be unreasonable to reject that conclusion. Importantly, principles can only be rejected by individuals; aggregation of reasons across individuals is not allowed. So if someone's generic reasons carry more weight than anyone else's generic reasons, then his generic reasons are (for the most part) decisive in determining principles.

The generic reasons that are open to consideration under the contractualist formulation are any reasons we judge as relevant to reasonable rejectability. This requires that we exercise our judgment in determining whether such reasons would be suitable grounds for mutual recognition. Therefore, that a principle would negatively affect a person's well-being is not the only kind of reason that may be brought against a principle. Other considerations, such as how a burden would be imposed by a principle, can serve as reasonable grounds for rejection.

While contractualism provides an account only of the central part of morality that deals with what we owe to each other, Scanlon writes that this part of morality is related to the broader realm of morality in complex ways. There is pressure for the morality of what we owe to each other to acknowledge the values included in the broader realm of morality insofar as principles that make no room for these values could be reasonably rejected. In turn, these values must accommodate the dictates of what we owe to each other to the extent that they involve relations with others, who have separate moral standing.

=== Reasons fundamentalism ===
In his 2009 John Locke Lectures at Oxford, Scanlon argued in favor of what he calls reasons fundamentalism. This is "the thesis that there are irreducibly normative truths about reasons for action." Scanlon refined and published this material in his book Being Realistic about Reasons (2014).

== In popular culture ==
Scanlon's What We Owe to Each Other is referenced several times in the American comedy television series The Good Place, as a text used to instruct the protagonist Eleanor Shellstrop. The phrase "What We Owe to Each Other" is used as the title of the sixth episode of the first season, and that episode features a summary of Scanlon's ideas, as does the season two finale. In the segue between season one and two, Eleanor opens the book to the title page, desperate to use the page to pen a note about the importance of keeping in touch with Chidi Anagonye, a professor of ethics and moral philosophy. Scanlon's ideas play a prominent role in the series finale, in which Eleanor finally finishes reading Scanlon's book and uses the principles of contractualism to explain a crucial decision that she makes.

== Selected works ==
=== Books ===
- Scanlon, T. M. (1998). What we owe to each other. Cambridge, Massachusetts: Belknap Press of Harvard University Press. ISBN 9780674950894.
- Scanlon, T. M. (2003). The difficulty of tolerance: essays in political philosophy. Cambridge; New York: Cambridge University Press. ISBN 9780511615153.
- Scanlon, T. M. (2008). Moral dimensions: permissibility, meaning, blame. Cambridge, Massachusetts: Belknap Press of Harvard University Press. ISBN 9780674043145.
- Scanlon, T. M. (2014). Being realistic about reasons. Oxford: Oxford University Press. ISBN 9780199678488.
- Scanlon, T. M. (2018). Why does inequality matter?. Oxford: Oxford University Press. ISBN 9780198812692.
- Scanlon, T. M. (2025). Morality and Responsibility. Cambridge: Polity Press. ISBN 9781509566976.

=== Chapters in books ===
- Scanlon, T. M. (1977), "Due process", in Pennock, J. Roland; Chapman, John W. (eds.), Due process, Nomos Series no. 18, New York: New York University Press, pp. 93–125, ISBN 9780814765692. Preview.
- Scanlon, Thomas M. (1977), "Liberty, contract, and contribution", in Dworkin, Gerald; Bermant, Gordon; Brown, Peter G. (eds.), Markets and morals, Washington; New York: Hemisphere Pub. Corp. Distributed solely by Halsted Press, pp. 43–67, ISBN 9780470991695.
- Scanlon, Thomas M. (1979), "Human rights as a neutral concern", in Brown, Peter; McLean, Douglas (eds.), Human rights and U.S. foreign policy: principles and applications, Lexington, Massachusetts: Lexington Books, pp. 83–92, ISBN 9780669028072.
- Scanlon, Thomas M. (1981), "Ethics and the control of research", in Gaylin, Willard; Macklin, Ruth; Powledge, Tabitha M. (eds.), Violence and the politics of research, New York: Plenum Press, pp. 225–256, ISBN 9780306407895.
- Scanlon, T. M. (1982), "Contractualism and utilitarianism", in Sen, Amartya; Williams, Bernard (eds.), Utilitarianism and beyond, Cambridge: Cambridge University Press, pp. 103–128, ISBN 9780511611964.
- Scanlon, T. M. (1988), "The significance of choice", in Sen, Amartya; McMurrin, Sterling M. (eds.), The Tanner lectures on human values VIII, Salt Lake City: University of Utah Press, pp. 149–216, ISBN 9780874803020. Pdf.
- Scanlon, T. M. (1991), "The moral basis of interpersonal comparisons", in Elster, Jon; Roemer, John E. (eds.), Interpersonal comparisons of well-being, Cambridge England New York: Cambridge University Press, pp. 17–44, ISBN 9780521457224.
- Scanlon, T. M. (1997). The diversity of objections to inequality. The Lindley Lecture, 1996. Lawrence, Kansas: Dept. of Philosophy, University of Kansas. Pdf.

Reprinted as: Scanlon, T. M. (2000), "The diversity of objections to inequality", in Clayton, Matthew; Williams, Andrew (eds.), The ideal of equality, Houndmills, Basingstoke, Hampshire New York: Macmillan Press St. Martin's Press, pp. 41–59, ISBN 9780333686980.

Also available as: Scanlon, T. M. (1996). "La varietà delle obiezioni alla disegualianza". Filosofia e Questioni Pubbliche (Philosophy and Public Issues) (in Italian). 2 (2). Roma Luiss Management: 3–19.

- Scanlon, T. M. (1999), "Punishment and the rule of law", in Koh, Harold Hongju; Slye, Ronald (eds.), Deliberative democracy and human rights, New Haven, Connecticut: Yale University Press, pp. 257–271, ISBN 9780300081671.
- Scanlon, T. M. (2001), "Promises and contracts", in Benson, Peter (ed.), The theory of contract law: new essays, Cambridge Studies in Philosophy and Law Series, Cambridge England New York: Cambridge University Press, pp. 86–117, ISBN 9780521041324.
- Scanlon, T. M. (2002), "Reasons and passions", in Buss, Sarah; Overton, Lee (eds.), Contours of agency: essays on themes from Harry Frankfurt, Cambridge, Massachusetts: MIT Press, pp. 165–188, ISBN 9780262025133.
- Scanlon, T. M. (2004), "Reasons: a puzzling duality?", in Wallace, R. Jay; Pettit, Philip; Scheffler, Samuel; Smith, Michael (eds.), Reason and value: themes from the moral philosophy of Joseph Raz, New York: Oxford University Press, pp. 231–246, OCLC 648260069.
- Scanlon, T. M. (2006), "Justice, responsibility, and the demands of equality", in Sypnowich, Christine (ed.), The egalitarian conscience: essays in honour of G.A. Cohen, New York: Oxford University Press, pp. 70–87, ISBN 9780199281688.
- Scanlon, T. M. (2009), "Rights and interests", in Kanbur, Ravi; Basu, Kaushik (eds.), Arguments for a better world: essays in honor of Amartya Sen | Volume I: Ethics, welfare, and measurement, Oxford New York: Oxford University Press, pp. 68–79, ISBN 9780199239115.
- Scanlon, T. M. (2011), "How I am not a Kantian", in Parfit, Derek; Scheffler, Samuel (eds.), On what matters (volume 2), Oxford: Oxford University Press, pp. 116–139, ISBN 9781283160179.
- Scanlon, T. M. (2012), "The appeal and limits of constructivism", in Lenman, James; Shemmer, Yonatan (eds.), Constructivism in practical philosophy, Oxford: Oxford University Press, pp. 226–242, ISBN 9780191631191.
- Scanlon, T. M. (2013), "Interpreting blame", in Coates, D. Justin; Tognazzini, Neal A. (eds.), Blame: its nature and norms, Oxford New York: Oxford University Press, pp. 84–100, ISBN 9780199860821.

=== Articles ===
- Scanlon, Thomas (Winter 1972). "A theory of freedom of expression". Philosophy & Public Affairs. 1 (2). Wiley: 204–226. JSTOR 2264971.
- Scanlon, Thomas (Summer 1975). "Thomson on privacy". Philosophy & Public Affairs. 4 (4). Wiley: 315–322. JSTOR 2265076.
- Scanlon, T. M. (November 1975). "Preference and urgency". The Journal of Philosophy. 72 (19): 655–669. doi:10.2307/2024630. JSTOR 2024630.
- Scanlon, Thomas (Autumn 1976). "Nozick on rights, liberty, and property". Philosophy & Public Affairs. 6 (2). Wiley: 3–25. JSTOR 2265059.
- Scanlon, T. M. (1977). "Due process". Nomos. 18: 93–125. JSTOR 24219202.
- Scanlon, T. M. (May 1977). "Rights, goals, and fairness". Erkenntnis. 11 (1): 81–95. doi:10.1007/BF00169845. JSTOR 20010534. S2CID 189888868.
- Scanlon, T. M. (October 1986). "Equality of resources and equality of welfare: a forced marriage?" (PDF). Ethics. 97 (1): 111–118. doi:10.1086/292820. JSTOR 2381409. S2CID 170236973. Pdf.
- Scanlon, Thomas (Summer 1990). "Promises and practices". Philosophy & Public Affairs. 19 (3). Wiley: 199–226. JSTOR 2265394.
- Scanlon, T. M. (Spring 1992). "The aims and authority of moral theory". Oxford Journal of Legal Studies. 12 (1): 1–23. doi:10.1093/ojls/12.1.1. JSTOR 764567.
- Scanlon, T. M. (June 1995). "Moral theory: understanding and disagreement: Reviewed work: The Viability of Moral Theory by Allan Gibbard, Alasdair MacIntyre". Philosophy and Phenomenological Research. 55 (2): 343–356. doi:10.2307/2108551. JSTOR 2108551.
- Scanlon, Thomas (Spring 1997). "The status of well-being". Michigan Quarterly Review. XXXVI (2). University of Michigan: 290–310. hdl:2027/spo.act2080.0036.210. See also Tanner lecture pdf.
- Scanlon, T. M. (July 2000). "Intention and permissibility: T. M. Scanlon". Aristotelian Society, Supplementary Volume. 74 (1): 301–317. doi:10.1111/1467-8349.00073. Pdf.

See also: Dancy, Jonathan (July 2000). "Intention and permissibility: Jonathan Dancy". Aristotelian Society, Supplementary Volume. 74 (1): 319–338. doi:10.1111/1467-8349.00074.

- Scanlon, T. M. (2003). "Individualism, equality, and rights". University of Miami Law Review. 58 (1). University of Miami School of Law: 359–368. Pdf.
- Scanlon, T. M. (January 2003). "Reply to Gauthier and Gibbard: Précis of What We Owe to Each Other". Philosophy and Phenomenological Research. 66 (1): 176–189. doi:10.1111/j.1933-1592.2003.tb00249.x. JSTOR 20140523.

See also: Gauthier, David (January 2003). "Are we moral debtors?: Reviewed work: What We Owe to Each Other by T. M. Scanlon". Philosophy and Phenomenological Research. 66 (1): 162–168. doi:10.1111/j.1933-1592.2003.tb00250.x. JSTOR 20140521.
See also: Gibbard, Allan (January 2003). "Reasons to reject allowing: Reviewed work: What We Owe to Each Other by T. M. Scanlon" (PDF). Philosophy and Phenomenological Research. 66 (1): 169–175. doi:10.1111/j.1933-1592.2003.tb00251.x. hdl:2027.42/73518. JSTOR 20140522.

- Scanlon, T. M. (November 2003). "Metaphysics and morals". Proceedings and Addresses of the American Philosophical Association. 77 (2): 7–22. doi:10.2307/3219738. JSTOR 3219738.
- Scanlon, T. M. (December 2003). "Replies". Ratio. 16 (4): 424–439. doi:10.1046/j.1467-9329.2003.00231.x.

See also: O'Neill, Onora (December 2003). "Constructivism vs. contractualism". Ratio. 16 (4): 319–331. doi:10.1046/j.1467-9329.2003.00226.x.
See also: Wolff, Jonathan (December 2003). "Scanlon on well-being". Ratio. 16 (4): 332–345. doi:10.1046/j.1467-9329.2003.00227.x.
See also: Raz, Joseph (December 2003). "Numbers, with and without contractualism". Ratio. 16 (4): 346–367. doi:10.1046/j.1467-9329.2003.00228.x.
See also: Parfit, Derek (December 2003). "Justifiability to each person". Ratio. 16 (4): 368–390. doi:10.1046/j.1467-9329.2003.00229.x.
See also: Timmons, Mark (December 2003). "The limits of moral constructivism". Ratio. 16 (4): 391–423. doi:10.1046/j.1467-9329.2003.00230.x.

- Scanlon, T. M. (May 2011). "Why not base free speech on autonomy or democracy?". Virginia Law Review. 97 (3). The Virginia Law Review Association: 541–548. JSTOR 41261520. Pdf.
- Scanlon, T. M. (October 2011). "Forum: libertarianism and liberty". Boston Review. Boston Critic, Inc.
- Scanlon, T. M. (June 2012). "Provocation: everyone is a philosopher!". Harvard Law Review Forum. 125. The Harvard Law Review Association: 228–235.
- Scanlon, T. M. (Spring 2013). "Responsibility and the value of choice". Think. 12 (33): 9–16. doi:10.1017/S1477175612000280.
- Scanlon, Thomas M. (June 2013). "Giving desert its due". Philosophical Explorations. 16 (2): 101–116. doi:10.1080/13869795.2013.787437. S2CID 96470140.
- Scanlon, T. M. (June 2015). "Kamm on the disvalue of death". Journal of Medical Ethics. 41 (6): 490. doi:10.1136/medethics-2014-102037. PMID 25005111. S2CID 38143185.

See also: Kamm, Frances (June 2015). "Summary of Bioethical Prescriptions". Journal of Medical Ethics. 41 (6): 488–489. doi:10.1136/medethics-2014-102018. PMID 24797609. S2CID 33549534.

== Sources ==
Interviews with Scanlon

- 'The Kingdom of Ends on the Cheap' in Alex Voorhoeve Conversations on Ethics. Oxford University Press, 2009. ISBN 978-0-19-921537-9
- "Ethics of Blame"
- An Interview with T. M. Scanlon by Yascha Mounk, 2012-07-07.
- Interview with Fifteen Minutes Magazine, The Harvard Crimson. Asking Philosopher T. M. Scanlon ‘What We Owe to Each Other’
