= Tommie Shelby =

American philosopher (born 1967)

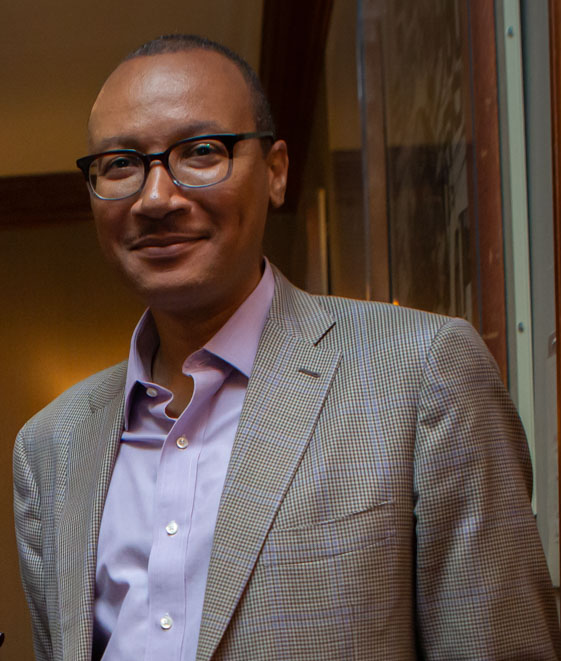
- Shelby at the Edmond J. Safra Center for Ethics in 2020
- Born: 1967 (age 58–59)
- Relatives: T. M. Scanlon (father-in-law)

Education
- Education: University of Pittsburgh
- Doctoral advisor: David Gauthier

Philosophical work
- Era: Contemporary philosophy
- Region: Western philosophy
- School: Africana philosophy
- Institutions: Harvard University; Ohio State University
- Main interests: Political philosophy, social theory, philosophy of social science

Tommie Shelby (born 1967) is an American philosopher. Since 2013, he has served as the Caldwell Titcomb Professor of African and African American Studies and of Philosophy at Harvard University, where he is the current chair of the Department of African and African American Studies. He is particularly known for his work in Africana philosophy, social and political philosophy, social theory (especially Marxist theory), and the philosophy of social science.

== Education and career ==
Shelby was the eldest of six children. He was a self-described "jock" in high school, competing in basketball and track. He earned his B.A. in philosophy from Florida A&M University in 1990 and his Ph.D. in philosophy with a certificate in cultural studies from the University of Pittsburgh in 1998. His dissertation, Marxism and the Critique of Moral Ideology, was directed by David Gauthier.

Before moving to Harvard University as an assistant professor in 2000, he was an assistant professor of philosophy at Ohio State University from 1998 to 2000. He was the John L. Loeb Associate Professor of the Social Sciences at Harvard from 2004 to 2007. Shelby is the second black scholar to be tenured in the philosophy department at Harvard. The first was Kwame Anthony Appiah, now a professor at New York University.

Shelby served as an editor of Transition Magazine and of the Du Bois Review. In 2015, he was elected to the Pulitzer Prize Board. In June 2022, he was elected as the Board's 2022-2024 co-chair, serving alongside Poynter Institute President Neil Brown. Shelby also was elected to the American Academy of Arts and Sciences in 2019.

== Research areas and publications ==
Shelby is the author of We Who Are Dark: The Philosophical Foundations of Black Solidarity (Harvard University Press, 2005). The book discusses the history of black political thought from Martin Delany to Malcolm X and extrapolates a new theory for black political solidarity consistent with liberal values of individual liberty, social equality, and cultural tolerance. Orlando Patterson described the book as "contest[ing] the movement's central claims at a level of sociophilosophical sophistication that one rarely encounters." Bill Lawson, in his review of Shelby's book in Notre Dame Philosophical Reviews, described it as a "provocative and insightful book." He continued, "Professor Shelby has done a great service to both philosophical and historical academic studies... What makes this book worth reading beyond the scholarship and its scholarly insights is Professor Shelby's attempt to move Black Nationalism into the post-civil rights era."

Shelby is also the co-editor of Hip-Hop and Philosophy: Rhyme 2 Reason with Derrick Darby. In his review of the book, Tommy J. Curry said that it is "...a great work that inhabits the tension between the sterile thought of the academy and the rich lives of many young urban Americans." Shelby also co-edited Transition 99 with Henry Louis Gates Jr., K. Anthony Appiah and F. Abiola Irele, and is the author of the entry on Black Nationalism in the Routledge Encyclopedia of Philosophy Online.

His second monograph, Dark Ghettos: Injustice, Dissent, and Reform, was published by the Belknap Press of Harvard University Press in 2016. His third book, The Idea of Prison Abolition, was published by Princeton University Press in 2022.

Shelby is the son-in-law of Harvard philosopher Thomas Scanlon.

== See also ==
- Africana philosophy
- African American philosophers
