= David S. Oderberg =

Australian philosopher (born 1963)

David Simon Oderberg (born 1963) is an Australian philosopher of metaphysics and ethics based in Britain since 1987. He is Professor of Philosophy at the University of Reading. He describes himself as a non-consequentialist or a traditionalist in his works. Broadly speaking, Oderberg places himself in opposition to Peter Singer and other utilitarian or consequentialist thinkers. He has published over thirty academic papers and has authored six books: The Metaphysics of Good and Evil, Opting Out: Conscience and Cooperation in a Pluralistic Society, Real Essentialism, Applied Ethics, Moral Theory and The Metaphysics of Identity over Time. Oderberg is an alumnus of the universities of Melbourne, where he completed his first degrees, and Oxford where he gained his DPhil.

He was appointed editor of Ratio, the philosophical quarterly, in late 2012.

== Applied Ethics ==
Applied Ethics, which was first published in 2000, has become one of the most important of Oderberg's works. Oderberg applies his classical viewpoint to some controversial ethical issues: abortion, euthanasia, animal rights, capital punishment and the just war theory. Oderberg provides a detailed defence of the view that abortion is morally wrong because the fetus is an innocent life, and intentionally taking an innocent life is always morally wrong. He aims to refute views like those of Peter Singer, who suggests that we deny that it is always wrong to intentionally kill innocent human beings. Oderberg compares legalised abortion to contract killing, arguing that the state has no more right to legalise and regulate abortion on the ground that this would take it out of the 'back street', than it does to legalise and regulate contract killing on the same ground. On the subject of euthanasia, he argues that it too is immoral, because, like abortion, it involves the intentional killing of an innocent human being. Voluntary euthanasia is no more justifiable than involuntary, since a person has no absolute right to do whatever they want with their body. Furthermore, he believes the current scientific definition of brain death is unsatisfactory both on metaphysical grounds and from an ethical point of view. Oderberg's position on animal rights is similar to that of Aquinas – rejecting in principle the idea that humans have duties to animals because they are not moral agents, he nonetheless believes that humans still have duties in respect of them to treat them kindly. On the death penalty, Oderberg supports the state's right to enforce capital punishment, because justice must be retributive and death, being the worst punishment, is the suitable punishment for the worst crime – e.g. murder. Oderberg supports just war theory and believes that civilians who do not contribute to the war effort should not be targeted. In virtue of this, he regards the use of atomic warfare in World War II to have been a seriously immoral act. He also regards contraception as immoral, and exhorts 'pro-lifers' like himself to engage in 'campaigning, protesting, writing, or whatever it is that we do best in defending the pro-life cause.'

== Books ==
- The Metaphysics of Good and Evil. London/New York: Routledge. 2020.
- Opting Out: Conscience and Cooperation in a Pluralistic Society. London: Institute of Economic Affairs. 2018. p. 158. ISBN 978-0255367615.
- Real Essentialism. London: Routledge. 2007. ISBN 978-0415323642.
- Applied Ethics: A Non-Consequentialist Approach'. Oxford: Blackwell. 2000. pp. 248pp. ISBN 0 631 21905 6.
- Moral Theory: A Non-Consequentialist Approach. Oxford: Blackwell. 2000. p. 197. ISBN 0 631 21903 X.
- Form and Matter: Themes in Contemporary Metaphysics. Oxford: Blackwell. 1999. p. 132. ISBN 978-0631213895.
- The Metaphysics of Identity over Time. London/New York: Macmillan/St Martin's Press. 1993. p. 228. ISBN 0 333 59351 0.

== Articles ==
- 'The Morality of Reputation and the Judgment of Others', Journal of Practical Ethics 1 (2013): 3–33
- 'Synthetic Life and the Bruteness of Immanent Causation', in E. Feser (ed.) Aristotle on Method and Metaphysics (Basingstoke: Palgrave Macmillan, 2013): 206–35.
- 'Natural Law and Rights Theory', in G. Gaus and F. D'Agostino (eds) The Routledge Companion to Social and Political Philosophy (London: Routledge, 2013): 375–86.
- 'Survivalism, Corruptionism, and Mereology', European Journal for Philosophy of Religion 4 (2012): 1–26.
- 'Hume, the Occult, and the Substance of the School', Metaphysica 13 (2012): 155–74.
- 'No Potency without Actuality: The Case of Graph Theory', in Tuomas E. Tahko (ed.) Contemporary Aristotelian Metaphysics (Cambridge: Cambridge University Press, 2012): 207–28.
- 'Graph Structuralism and its Discontents: Rejoinder to Shackel', Analysis 72 (2012): 94–8.
- 'Disembodied Communication and Religious Experience: The Online Model', Philosophy and Technology 25 (2012): 381–97.
- 'Essence and Properties', Erkenntnis 75 (2011): 85–111.
- 'Morality, Religion, and Cosmic Justice', Philosophical Investigations 34 (2011): 189–213. (Invited contribution to special issue on the theme 'Ethics and Religion'.)
- 'The World is not an Asymmetric Graph', Analysis 71 (2011): 3–10.
- 'The Metaphysical Foundations of Natural Law', in H. Zaborowski (ed.) Natural Moral Law in Contemporary Society (Washington, DC: Catholic University of America Press, 2010): 44–75.
- 'The Doctrine of Double Effect', in T. O'Connor and C. Sandis (eds) A Companion to the Philosophy of Action (Oxford: Wiley-Blackwell, 2010): 324–30.
- ‘"Whatever is Changing is Being Changed by Something Else": A Reappraisal of Premise One of the First Way', in J. Cottingham and P. Hacker (eds) Mind, Method and Morality: Essays in Honour of Anthony Kenny (Oxford: Oxford University Press, 2010): 140–64.
- 'Persistence', in J. Kim, E. Sosa, and G. Rosenkrantz (eds) A Companion to Metaphysics, 2nd ed. (Oxford: Wiley-Blackwell, 2009): 55–65.
- 'The Non-Identity of the Categorical and the Dispositional', Analysis 69 (2009): 677–84.
- 'The Metaphysical Status of the Embryo: Some Arguments Revisited', Journal of Applied Philosophy 25 (2008): 263–76.
- 'Concepts, Dualism, and the Human Intellect', in A. Antonietti, A. Corradini, and E.J. Lowe (eds) Psycho-Physical Dualism Today: An Interdisciplinary Approach (Lanham, MD: Lexington Books/Rowman and Littlefied, 2008): 211–33.
- 'Self-Love, Love of Neighbour, and Impartiality', in N. Athanassoulis and S. Vice (eds), The Moral Life: Essays in Honour of John Cottingham (Basingstoke: Palgrave Macmillan, 2008): 58–84.
- 'Teleology: Inorganic and Organic', in A.M. González (ed.), Contemporary Perspectives on Natural Law (Aldershot: Ashgate, 2008): 259–79.
- 'The Cosmological Argument', in C. Meister and P. Copan (eds) The Routledge Companion to Philosophy of Religion (London: Routledge, 2007): 341–50.
- 'Instantaneous Change without Instants', in C. Paterson and M.S. Pugh (eds) Analytical Thomism: Traditions in Dialogue (Aldershot: Ashgate, 2006): 101–18.
- (with J.A. Laing) 'Artificial Reproduction, the "Welfare Principle", and the Common Good', Medical Law Review 13 (2005): 328–56.
- 'Towards a Natural Law Critique of Genetic Engineering', in N. Athanassoulis (ed.) Philosophical Reflections on Medical Ethics (Basingstoke: Palgrave Macmillan, 2005): 109–134.
- 'Hylemorphic Dualism', in E.F. Paul, F.D. Miller, and J. Paul (eds) Personal Identity (Cambridge: Cambridge University Press, 2005): 70–99. (Originally in Social Philosophy and Policy 22 (2005): 70–99.)
- 'Predicate Logic and Bare Particulars', in D.S. Oderberg (ed.) The Old New Logic: Essays on the Philosophy of Fred Sommers (Cambridge, MA: MIT Press, 2005): 183–210.
- 'The Structure and Content of the Good', in D.S. Oderberg and T. Chappell (eds) Human Values: New Essays on Ethics and Natural Law (London: Palgrave Macmillan, 2004; rev. ed. p/back 2007): 127–65.
- 'The Beginning of Existence', International Philosophical Quarterly 43 (2003): 145–57.
- 'Temporal Parts and the Possibility of Change', Philosophy and Phenomenological Research 69 (2004): 686–708.
- 'The Ethics of Co-operation in Wrongdoing', in A. O'Hear (ed.) Modern Moral Philosophy (Cambridge: Cambridge University Press, 2004; Royal Institute of Philosophy Annual Lecture Series 2002-3): 203–27. (abstract; full text)
- 'Intelligibility and Intensionality', Acta Analytica 17 (2002) 171-8.
- 'The Tristram Shandy Paradox: A Reply to Graham Oppy', Philosophia Christi 4 (2002): 353–6.
- 'Traversal of the Infinite, the “Big Bang” and the Kalam Cosmological Argument', Philosophia Christi 4 (2002): 305–34.
- 'Hylomorphism and Individuation', in J. Haldane (ed.) Mind, Metaphysics, and Value in the Thomistic and Analytical Traditions (University of Notre Dame Press, 2002: 125–42).
- 'How to Win Essence Back from Essentialists', Philosophical Writings (No. 18, Autumn 2001): 27–45.
- 'The Kalam Cosmological Argument Neither Bloodied nor Bowed: A Response to Graham Oppy', Philosophia Christi 3 (2001): 193–6.
- 'Is There a Right to be Wrong?', Philosophy 75 (2000): 517–37.
- 'On the Cardinality of the Cardinal Virtues', International Journal of Philosophical Studies 7 (1999): 305–22.
- 'Adolf Grünbaum and the Beginning of the Universe', Philosophia Naturalis 36 (1999): 187–94.
- 'Analytická morálna filozofia v20.storocí' (Analytical Moral Philosophy in the 20th Century), in V. Gluchman & M. Dokulil (eds.), Súcasné Etické Teórie (Contemporary Ethical Theories) (Presov, Slovakia, 1998): 9–23.
- 'On an Alleged Fallacy in Aristotle', Philosophical Papers 27 (1998): 107–18.
- 'Modal Properties, Moral Status and Identity', Philosophy and Public Affairs 26 (1997): 259–98.
- 'Voluntary Euthanasia and Justice', in D.S. Oderberg and J.A. Laing (eds.) Human Lives: Critical Essays on Consequentialist Bioethics (London: Macmillan, 1997): 225–40.
- 'Coincidence under a Sortal', The Philosophical Review 105 (1996): 145–71.
- 'A Paradox about Authority', Analysis 51 (1991): 153–160.
- 'Some Problems of Identity over Time', Cogito 5 (1991): 14–20.
- 'Reply to Sprigge on Personal and Impersonal Identity', Mind 98 (1989): 129–34.
- 'Johnston on Human Beings', The Journal of Philosophy 86 (1989): 137–41.
- 'Kripke and "Quus" ', Theoria 53 (1987): 115–20.
- 'Perceptual Relativism', Philosophia 16 (1986): 1–9.
