= Compliance problem =

Problem in contractarian ethics

The compliance problem is a problem in contractarian ethics. It states that it is in the individuals' best interest to agree to contract, but not to comply to them.

Thomas Hobbes first outlined the compliance problem in The Leviathan with the character called 'the foole'. His suggested solution was political coercion and oppression.

David Gauthier is a leading philosopher on the compliance problem. His suggested solution includes the theory of "maximin proportionate gain".

Recent scholarship "suggest the need for the creation of proactive encouragement of compliance programmes. Antitrust authorities should work with the business community to create a regulatory scheme that rewards good behaviour while punishing bad behaviour."

== See also ==
- Bankruptcy fraud
- Breach of contract
- Default (finance)
