= Philosophy & Public Affairs =

- Discipline: Philosophy, public policy, administration
- Language: English
- Edited by: Jason Brennan

Publication details
- History: 1972–present
- Publisher: John Wiley & Sons
- Frequency: Quarterly
- Impact factor: 2.000 (2020)

Standard abbreviations
- ISO 4: Philos. Public Aff.

Indexing
- ISSN: 0048-3915 (print); 1088-4963 (web)
- LCCN: 75617421
- JSTOR: 00483915
- OCLC no.: 40777411

Links
- Journal homepage; Online access; Online archive

Philosophy & Public Affairs is a quarterly peer-reviewed academic journal published by John Wiley & Sons. It publishes philosophical articles on legal, social, and political issues. The journal was established in 1972 under the sponsorship of Princeton University Press. Blackwell (now Wiley) became the journal's publisher in 2004. The current editor-in-chief is Jason Brennan (Georgetown University). According to the Journal Citation Reports, the journal has a 2020 impact factor of 2.000, ranking it 100th out of 183 journals in the category "Political Science" and 20th out of 56 journals in the category "Ethics".

== History ==
The journal was founded by Marshall Cohen, T. M. Scanlon, and Thomas Nagel.

In May 2024, after pressure from the Wiley to increase the number of articles published in the journal, the executive, associate, and advisory editors and all of the editorial board members resigned en masse. In a letter to Wiley, the outgoing editors and editorial board members stated an intention to launch a new diamond open-access journal to be published by Open Library of Humanities (OLH), with editorial members occupying the same positions they held at Philosophy & Public Affairs. In September 2024, the former editors of Philosophy & Public Affairs opened the new journal, Free & Equal: A Journal of Ethics and Public Affairs, for submissions. In October 2024, Philosophy & Public Affairs announced that it would continue publication with a new editorial board under the leadership of editor-in-chief Jason Brennan.

== See also ==
- List of ethics journals
- List of philosophy journals
- List of political science journals
