= Linguistic norm =

The literary norm, linguistic norm, linguistic standard, or language norm is a historically determined set of commonly used language assets, as well as rules for their selection and use, which have been recognized by society as the most appropriate in a particular historical period. These are the collective rules for implementing the language system.

The language norm is one of the essential properties of language, ensuring its functioning and historical continuity due to its inherent stability, although not excluding the variability of language devices and noticeable historical variability, since the norm is intended, on the one hand, to preserve speech traditions, and on the other, to satisfy current and changing social needs.
