= Permission (philosophy) =

Permission, in philosophy, is the attribute of a person whose performance of a specific action, otherwise ethically wrong or dubious, would thereby involve no ethical fault. The term "permission" is more commonly used to refer to consent. Consent is the legal embodiment of the concept, in which approval is given to another party.

Permissions depend on norms or institutions.

Many permissions and obligations are complementary to each other, and deontic logic is a tool sometimes used in reasoning about such relationships.
