= Ratio (journal) =

Ratio: An International Journal of Analytical Philosophy
- Discipline: Philosophy
- Language: English
- Edited by: David S. Oderberg

Publication details
- History: 1988–present
- Publisher: Wiley-Blackwell
- Frequency: Quarterly

Standard abbreviations
- ISO 4: Ratio

Indexing
- ISSN: 0034-0006 (print); 1467-9329 (web)
- LCCN: 64029939
- OCLC no.: 49888740

Links
- Journal homepage

Ratio is a peer-reviewed academic journal of analytic philosophy, edited by David S. Oderberg (Reading University) and published by Wiley-Blackwell. Ratio is published quarterly and in December publishes a special issue that is focused specifically on one area, calling on specialists in that field of study to contribute.

It is a successor to a previous journal, also called Ratio and published in parallel editions in German and English. It was sponsored by the Society for the Furtherance of the Critical Philosophy and the Philosophisch-politische Akademie which ran from 1957 until December 1987 with 29 volumes.
