= David Gauthier =

Canadian philosopher (1932–2023)

David Gauthier FRSC
- Born: David Peter Gauthier; 10 September 1932; Toronto, Ontario, Canada
- Died: 9 November 2023 (aged 91)

Education
- Education: University of Toronto (B.A., 1954); Harvard University (A.M., 1955); University of Oxford (B.Phil., 1957; D.Phil., 1961)

Philosophical work
- Era: Contemporary philosophy
- Region: Western philosophy
- School: Analytic; Contractarianism; Contractarian ethics Classical liberalism
- Institutions: University of Toronto; University of Pittsburgh
- Doctoral students: Ann Cudd; Tommie Shelby; Peter Vallentyne
- Main interests: Political philosophy, game theory, rational choice theory
- Notable ideas: Contractarian ethics (morals by agreement), constrained maximization, translucency, Gauthier's Lockean proviso

David Peter Gauthier (/ˈɡoʊti.eɪ/; 10 September 1932 – 9 November 2023) was a Canadian philosopher best known for his neo-Hobbesian or contractarian theory of morality, as developed in his 1986 book Morals by Agreement.

== Life and career ==
David Gauthier was born in Toronto on 10 September 1932. He was educated at University College, University of Toronto (B.A. (Hons.), 1954), Harvard University (A.M., 1955), and the University of Oxford (B.Phil., 1957; D.Phil., 1961).

Gauthier taught at the University of Toronto from 1958 until 1980, when he joined the Department of Philosophy at the University of Pittsburgh, where he remained for the rest of his career.

In the 1962 Canadian federal election, Gauthier ran as a candidate for the New Democratic Party in the riding of Eglinton, in Toronto, placing third.

Gauthier also held visiting appointments at the University of California, Los Angeles, the University of California, Berkeley, Princeton University, the University of California, Irvine, and the University of Waterloo.

In 1979, he was elected a fellow of the Royal Society of Canada (F.R.S.C.). The asteroid 15911 Davidgauthier (1997 TL21) was named in his honour.

Gauthier died on 9 November 2023, at the age of 91.

== Philosophy ==
Gauthier was the author of numerous articles, some of the most important of which are collected in Moral Dealing, as well as several books including Practical Reasoning, The Logic of Leviathan, Morals by Agreement, and Rousseau: The Sentiment of Existence.

In addition to systematic work in moral theory, Gauthier was also interested in the history of political philosophy, especially Thomas Hobbes and Jean-Jacques Rousseau. He conducted work on the theory of practical rationality, where he began from an attempt to understand economic rationality, rather than from Kantian or Aristotelian antecedents.

Gauthier understood value as a matter of individuals' subjective preferences, and argued that moral constraints on straightforward utility-maximizing are prudentially justified. He argued that it is most prudent to give up straightforward maximizing and instead adopt a disposition of constrained maximization, according to which one resolves to cooperate with all similarly disposed persons (those disposed towards cooperation) and defect on the rest (straightforward maximizers), since repeated cooperation provides greater yields than repeated mutual defection from contracts (as is seen in a basic prisoner's dilemma game). According to Gauthier's contractarian ethics, moral constraints are justified because they make us all better off, in terms of our preferences (whatever they may be). A consequence is that good moral thinking is just an elevated and subtly strategic version of means–end reasoning.

In Morals by Agreement, Gauthier defines translucency. An individual is translucent if their intentions can be imperfectly detected (inferred or judged) by others. Celeste M. Friend argues against the argument of translucency in the evolution of cooperation. First, translucency might not be realistic in human societies. This first argument was first brought by Geoffrey Sayre-McCord. Second, translucency might be the product of social interactions: one often becomes more translucent as trust is gained, and not the other way round. Finally, excessive translucency would also reveal the underlying self-interest in being translucent, therefore hindering cooperation.

== Bibliography ==
- Practical Reasoning: The Structure and Foundations of Prudential and Moral Arguments and Their Exemplification in Discourse (Oxford: Clarendon Press, 1963).
- The Logic of Leviathan: The Moral and Political Theory of Thomas Hobbes (Oxford: Clarendon Press, 1969).
- Morals by Agreement (Oxford: Oxford University Press, 1986)
- Moral Dealing: Contract, Ethics, and Reason (Ithaca, Cornell University Press, 1990).
- Rousseau: The Sentiment of Existence (Cambridge: Cambridge University Press, 2006).

== See also ==
- American philosophy
- Compliance problem
- Social contract
