= Person-affecting view =

Idea that an act can only be wrong if it is bad for somebody

A person-affecting or person-based view (also called person-affecting restriction) in population ethics captures the intuition that an act can only be bad if it is bad for someone. Similarly something can be good only if it is good for someone. Therefore, according to standard person-affecting views, there is no moral obligation to create people nor moral good in creating people because nonexistence means "there is never a person who could have benefited from being created". Whether one accepts person-affecting views greatly influences to what extent shaping the far future is important if there are more potential humans in the future. Person-affecting views are also important in considering human population control.

A weaker form of person-affecting views states that an act can only be bad if it is bad for some existing or future person.

Person-affecting views can be seen as a revision of total utilitarianism in which the "scope of the aggregation" is changed from all individuals who would exist to a subset of those individuals (though the details of this vary, see the section below).

Some philosophers who have discussed person-affecting views include Derek Parfit, Jan Narveson, John Broome, Jeff McMahan, Larry Temkin, Tatjana Višak, Gustaf Arrhenius, Johann Frick, Nick Beckstead, and Hilary Greaves.

== Variants ==
There is no single "person-affecting view" but rather a variety of formulations all involving the idea of something being good or bad for someone.

- Gustaf Arrhenius formulates the "person-affecting restriction" as saying that moral claims "necessarily involve a reference to humans", so that statements only referencing "the scenery" or "the balance of the ecosystem" (without reference to humans) are excluded from moral consideration.
- Nick Beckstead states that the person-affecting view claims the following: "When aggregating the interests of different people to determine the value of an outcome, the interests of 'extra' people count for less or can be ignored" (where "extra" can mean different things in different contexts, but in each case actions cannot be good or bad for "extra" people).
- Beckstead further distinguishes between moderate and strict person-affecting views, where moderate views give less weight to "extra" people (so that while creating new lives that are good is a good thing, this is inferior to improving already-existing lives) while strict views do not consider "extra" people at all.
- Larry Temkin has developed a "narrow person-affecting view" on which "[i]n assessing possible outcomes, one should (1) focus on the status of independently existing people, with the aim of wanting them to be as well off as possible, and (2) ignore the status of dependently existing people, except that one wants to avoid harming them as much as possible."

=== Asymmetric person-affecting views ===
There are also asymmetric views, according to which it is considered bad or wrong to bring into this world lives that are not worth living, even though it is morally neutral to bring into this world lives that are worth living. Hard asymmetric views in particular can lead one to conclude that human extinction (or the extinction of all life) is good, according to Beckstead. However, according to Simon Knutsson, this can be the case for utilitarianism and consequentialism generally, not just asymmetric consequentialist theories, like negative utilitarianism and negative consequentialism.

Soft asymmetric views, like described by Teruji Thomas, hold that additional lives worth living can make up for bad lives, but once the bad lives are made up for, more lives worth living do not improve the outcome. These are less prone to the conclusion that extinction is good than hard asymmetric views.

== See also ==
- Antinatalism
- Mere addition paradox (also known as the repugnant conclusion)
- Natalism
- Nonidentity problem
- The Asymmetry (population ethics)
- Antifrustrationism
