= Mere addition paradox =

Problem in ethics

The mere addition paradox (also known as the repugnant conclusion) is a problem in population ethics identified by Derek Parfit and discussed in his book Reasons and Persons (1984). The paradox identifies the mutual incompatibility of four intuitively compelling assertions about the relative value of populations. Parfit’s original formulation of the repugnant conclusion is that "for any possible population of at least ten billion people, all with a very high quality of life, there must be some much larger imaginable population whose existence, if other things are equal, would be better, even though its members have lives that are barely worth living."

== The paradox ==
Parfit considers four populations, as depicted in the following diagram: A, A+, B− and B. Each bar represents a distinct group of people. The bars' width represents group size while the bar's height represents group happiness. Unlike A and B, A+ and B− are complex populations, each comprising two distinct groups of people. It is also stipulated that the lives of the members of each group are good enough that they would rather be alive than not exist.

Parfit makes the following three suggestions regarding the value of the populations:

1. A+ seems no worse than A. This is because the people in A are no worse-off in A+, while the additional people who exist in A+ are better off in A+ compared to A, since it is stipulated that their lives are good enough that it is better for them to be alive than to not exist.

2. B− seems better than A+. This is because B− has greater total and average happiness than A+.

3. B seems equally as good as B−, as the only difference between B− and B is that the two groups in B− are merged to form one group in B.

Together, these three comparisons entail that B is better than A. However, Parfit also observes the following:

4. When we directly compare A (a population with high average happiness) and B (a population with lower average happiness, but more total happiness because of its larger population), it may seem that B can be worse than A.

Thus, there is a paradox. The following intuitively plausible claims are jointly incompatible: (1) that A+ is no worse than A, (2) that B− is better than A+, (3) that B− is as good as B, and (4) that B can be worse than A.

=== The repugnant conclusion ===

Parfit argues that this mere addition from A to B can be repeated over and over, eventually resulting in a much larger population Z with only slightly positive welfare. The assessment that such a population Z would be better is what Parfit calls the repugnant conclusion.

== Responses ==
Some scholars, such as Larry Temkin and Stuart Rachels, argue that inconsistencies between the four claims (above) rely on the assumption that the "better than" relation is transitive. The inconsistency could then be resolved by rejecting the assumption. According to this view, although A+ is no worse than A, and B− is better than A+, it does not follow that B− is better than A.

Another response is the conclusion that total utilitarianism must be rejected in favour of average utilitarianism, which would result in situation A+ being evaluated as worse than A, as the average happiness is lower. According to Parfit, this would however lead to an absurd conclusion, as it implies that adding people with lives worth living would make the world worse simply because they lower the average quality of life.

Torbjörn Tännsjö argues that the intuition that B is worse than A is wrong. While the lives of those in B are worse than those in A, there are more of them, and thus the collective value of B is greater than A. Michael Huemer also argues that the repugnant conclusion is not repugnant.

A number of philosophers (including Torbjörn Tännsjö, Yew-Kwang Ng, Hilary Greaves and Toby Ord) have agreed that avoiding the repugnant conclusion is not a necessary criterion for a satisfactory theory of population ethics.

Other philosophers suggested that a universal theory of ethics may not exist. Gustaf Arrhenius proved that a theory of population ethics cannot simultaneously satisfy a number of plausible axioms.

== Variants ==
The very repugnant conclusion is a more counterintuitive version of the repugnant conclusion. It states that according to some ethical theories, for any population where everyone has very high well-being, there exists a better population consisting of two groups: a significant number of people with very negative well-being, and a much larger number of people having barely positive welfare.

== Economic measures ==
An alternative use of the term mere addition paradox was presented in a paper by Hassoun in 2010. It identifies paradoxical reasoning that occurs when certain statistical measures are used to calculate results over a population. For example, if a group of 100 people together control $100 worth of resources, the average wealth per capita is $1. If a single rich person then arrives with 1 million dollars, then the total group of 101 people controls $1,000,100, making average wealth per capita $9,901, implying a drastic shift away from poverty even though nothing has changed for the original 100 people. Hassoun defines a no mere addition axiom to be used for judging such statistical measures: "merely adding a rich person to a population should not decrease poverty" (although acknowledging that in actual practice adding rich people to a population may provide some benefit to the whole population).

== See also ==
- A Theory of Justice
- Asymmetry (population ethics)
- Average and total utilitarianism
- Carrying capacity
- Ecological footprint
- Nonidentity problem
- Human overpopulation
- Person-affecting view
- Sorites paradox
- Utility monster
- Industrial Revolution
