= Larry Temkin =

American philosopher

Larry Temkin is an American philosopher and Distinguished Professor Emeritus of philosophy at Rutgers University. Temkin’s research focuses on normative ethics and political philosophy, and his work has been highly influential, particularly his works Inequality (Oxford University press, 1993) and Rethinking the Good (Oxford University press, 2012).

Temkin received his Ph.D. in philosophy from Princeton University in 1983 under the supervision of Derek Parfit. He has previously taught at The University of Oxford and Harvard University. From 2000-2017, Temkin was professor of philosophy at Rutgers University, serving as chair of the department from 2014 to 2017.

== Biography ==
Temkin graduated number one with a BA-Honors Degree from the University of Wisconsin–Madison in 1975, and received his Ph.D. in philosophy from Princeton University in 1983 under the supervision of Derek Parfit. He also studied at Oxford University in 1978-79. He began his professional career at Rice University, moving to Rutgers University in 2000. He has held Visiting Fellowships at the Australian National University, the National Institutes of Health, All Souls College (Oxford University), Harvard University’s Edmond J. Safra Center for Ethics, and the National Humanities Center. In 2011-2012, and is the Laurance S. Rockefeller Professor of Distinguished Teaching at Princeton University in the University Center for Human Values. Temkin served as the chair of the philosophy department at Rutgers University from 2014 until 2017.

== The nature of equality ==
Most work on equality asks whether equality is desirable, and, if so, what kind of equality we should seek. In Inequality, Temkin asks a more basic question: when is one situation worse than another with respect to inequality?

Sometimes the answer is obvious, but sometimes it is not. Consider, for instance, three situations: one in which many are well off and just a few are badly off, one in which many are badly off and just a few are well off, and one in which there is an equal number of well off and badly off people. The first situation may be one in which a minority has been singled out for mistreatment, making the inequality seem especially gratuitous or cruel. The second situation may be one in which a dominant elite oppresses and exploits the masses. And the third situation seems to feature the greatest deviations from pure equality. Other things being equal, it is hard to say which situation is worst with respect to equality. A case, it seems, can be made for any of the three.

Temkin uses such thought experiments to show that equality is not the simple notion it is often taken to be. Judgments of inequality's badness, he shows, turn on a host of considerations, such as how much deviation there is from pure equality, how gratuitous the inequality seems, and the extent to which individuals have an equality-based complaint. An individual's equality-based complaint, moreover, can depend on how she compares with the average person, the best off person, or all those better off than she; and, in addition, one might arrive at a judgment concerning the badness of an outcome’s inequality by adding individual complaints, focusing on the worst-off's complaints, or adding everyone's complaints, but giving special weight to larger complaints. In all, Temkin argues that at least eleven distinct aspects underlie egalitarian judgments.

Temkin also challenges the conventional view that equality is holistic (that it is concerned mainly with groups) and that it is essentially distributive. While inequalities between groups can be important, Temkin argues that, often, the proper object of moral concern is inequalities between individuals. And while equality is indeed a distributive principle, Temkin argues that what makes it distinctive is that it is essentially comparative – it expresses a fundamental concern for how individuals fare relative to each other. No other distributive principle, he argues, has that feature.

In all, Temkin mounts a case against the conventional view that equality is simple, holistic, and essentially distributive, and a powerful case for the view that it is complex, individualistic, and essentially comparative.

== Luck egalitarianism ==
Many contemporary egalitarians have been identified as luck egalitarians, believing, roughly, that it is bad when one person is worse off than another through no fault or choice of her own. Temkin argues that the egalitarian’s fundamental concern should not be with luck per se but with comparative fairness. His view is that, among equally deserving people, it is bad, because unfair, for some to be worse off than others through no fault or choice of their own. But, among unequally deserving people, it is not bad, because not unfair, for someone less deserving to be worse off than someone more deserving, even if the former is worse off through no fault or choice of her own.

To illustrate, egalitarians need not object if criminal John is worse off than law-abiding Mary, even if John craftily avoided capture and is worse off only because, through no fault or choice of his own, a falling limb injured him. In that case the effects of luck need not trouble egalitarians because they do not undermine comparative fairness.

On the other hand, egalitarians might well have reason to object if Betty injures herself saving a drowning child, and thus ends up worse off than others, even if the injury is a result of responsible free choice.

One might object that, on Temkin’s view, egalitarian concerns reduce to concerns about desert. But Temkin offers arguments suggesting that this is not so. First, on Temkin’s view, it is important that equally deserving people fare equally well, even if, in absolute terms, they are not getting what they deserve. Suppose that Fred and Martha both deserve to fare badly, and equally badly, but they both fare well, and equally well. That would be bad from the perspective of absolute desert but not from the perspective of comparative desert. From the perspective of absolute desert, but not from the perspective of comparative desert, it would be better if just one of them fared badly. So, Temkin shows that the concern for comparative fairness is not the same as the concern about absolute desert. Second, Temkin further argues that the concern about comparative fairness is distinct from the concern about comparative desert. Suppose that Susan is a really good person who chooses to give most of her income to the badly off, and that John is a less good person who permissibly chooses to spend his money on himself. If Susan predictably ends up worse off than John, this would be objectionable from the standpoint of comparative desert, since Susan is a morally more deserving person than John; but Temkin suggests that there may be no egalitarian objection to Susan’s being worse off than John, on the grounds that there may be no comparative unfairness in their relative positions, given that Susan autonomously chose to make herself worse off than John.

== Welfarism and the leveling down objection ==
Many reject egalitarianism because of the leveling down objection, which holds that there is no respect in which merely lowering someone from a higher to a lower level of welfare improves a situation, even if it increases equality. So, for example, it is argued that there is no respect in which putting out the eyes of the sighted would improve matters even though this would make everyone equally blind. If that is right, then equality would seem to lack intrinsic value.

Temkin defends egalitarianism against the leveling down objection. He argues that this objection derives much of its force from a widespread assumption – welfarism – according to which nothing matters morally except insofar as it impacts individual wellbeing. That view, Temkin argues, is counter-intuitive. It seems bad, after all, for sinners to fare better than saints even if there is no respect in which that is worse for the sinners or the saints. In general, Temkin argues that we value fairness and justice beyond the extent to which they are good for people. Welfarism, he writes, rules out impersonal ideals – those whose value does not lie wholly in their contributions to individual wellbeing – and many of our most important ideals, such as that of fairness, justice, knowledge, beauty, and truth are impersonal.

Of course, even if welfarism were false, it could still be the case that there is no respect in which leveling down the better off improves a situation. Temkin, however, thinks there is a respect in which this improves a situation – it does so with respect to equality. That, of course, does not mean that leveling down the better off would make things better all things considered. Equality, Temkin argues, is not all that matters, but it matters some.

== Equality and priority ==
Much recent work in political theory addresses whether egalitarianism should be replaced by prioritarianism. Prioritarians hold that an outcome’s goodness is a function of overall wellbeing across all individuals, with extra weight given to worse off individuals. This view first appeared under the name “the priority view” in Derek Parfit’s renowned 1991 article “Equality or Priority.” But the idea dates back to Temkin’s 1983 Ph.D. thesis, where it was presented under the name “extended humanitarianism.” And the word “prioritarianism” first appears in Temkin’s “Equality, Priority, and the Levelling Down Objection”. Prioritarianism has great plausibility. Many are drawn to the idea that making improvements in the wellbeing of the badly off should take priority over making equal improvements in the wellbeing of the well off. Prioritarianism, moreover, avoids the leveling down objection. Temkin, however, argues that it would be a mistake to jettison egalitarianism altogether since only egalitarianism reflects a fundamental concern for comparative fairness. There is an important place for egalitarian considerations in our all things considered judgments, Temkin argues, in addition to considerations of priority.

== Intransitivity and the nature of the good ==
Beginning with his groundbreaking ‘Intransitivity and the Mere Addition Paradox,’ and culminating in his magnum opus, Rethinking the Good: Moral Ideals, and the Nature of Practical Reasoning, Temkin has given a series of powerful arguments that call into question deeply held assumptions about value and about the nature of practical reasoning that play a central role in philosophy and in decision theory. According to decision theory, rational preferences must satisfy four fundamental axioms: Completeness (requiring preferences over, or indifference between, any pair of outcomes), Independence (requiring that one’s preference between a given pair of options does not depend on what other options are available), Continuity (requiring that if one prefers A to B and B to C, then one is indifferent between B and some gamble in which A and C are the two possible outcomes), and Transitivity (requiring that if you prefer A to B and B to C, then you prefer A to C). Temkin's arguments have called into question each one of these fundamental axioms, and his recent manuscript can be seen as a systematic account of the ways in which these axioms fail in cases involving moral reasoning. Thus, in addition to shedding light on the complexities of the moral domain, it arguably constitutes the most thorough challenge to the standard formal theory of practical rationality.

The present article will focus on the challenges Temkin raises against transitivity, since this principle plays a fundamental and pervasive role not only in decision theory, but also in philosophical arguments and in our ordinary, informal practical reasoning. While this principle has a great deal of prima facie plausibility, Temkin has shown that we cannot consistently endorse this principle while retaining our other most deeply held beliefs about morality and rational choice.

Here is an illustration of the problem. Most people accept a position that Temkin calls the First Standard View (FSV), which holds, roughly, that an outcome in which some people suffer a burden would be better than an outcome where many more people suffer a slightly smaller burden. So, for example, other things equal, an outcome where some number of people suffered from a given illness would be better than one where far more people suffered from an illness that was almost as bad. Most people also accept a position he calls the Second Standard View (SSV), which holds, roughly, that an outcome where a number of people suffer an extremely severe burden would be worse than one where any number of people suffer a minor burden. For example, most believe that, other things equal, an outcome in which ten people are severely tortured for their entire lives would be worse than an outcome in which any number of people must listen to a mildly unpleasant pop tune.

And yet, as Temkin has shown, these two deeply held beliefs are incompatible with Transitivity, in an argument that owes much to the Repugnant Conclusion. For there could be a spectrum of burdens ranging from the very severe to the very mild, such that FSV applies when comparing outcomes involving burdens near each other on the spectrum, while SSV applies when comparing outcomes involving burdens at opposite ends of the spectrum. Thus, FSV tells us that outcome A, where 10 people are severely tortured for their whole lives, would be better than outcome B, where 30 people suffer a burden almost as bad as (perhaps being severely tortured all their lives except for Sunday afternoons when they can watch football); that B would be better than outcome C, where 90 people suffer a burden almost as bad as the burden suffered in B, and so on. Continuing in this way, transitivity will entail that A, an outcome where 10 people are tortured for their whole lives, is better than some outcome Z, where some very large number of people must listen to a mildly unpleasant pop tune once per month. But SSV denies this. Thus, one must reject FSV, SSV, or the Axiom of Transitivity; but none of these will be easy to give up.

According to Temkin's diagnosis of this paradox, FSV reflects the fact that sometimes we adopt an additive-aggregationist approach in evaluating and comparing different outcomes. That is, we judge the relative goodness of two outcomes by comparing them in terms of both the quality and number of benefits or burdens and adding them up. On the other hand, SSV reflects the fact that sometimes we adopt an anti-additive-aggregationist approach in evaluating and comparing different outcomes. That is, for some comparisons, we do not simply add up the benefits and burdens in the different outcomes, but instead pay attention to how the benefits or burdens are distributed in the different outcomes and, in particular, to the relative impact on people's lives that the benefits and burdens have. Temkin has shown, however, that if we apply one set of criteria for making certain comparisons, and another set for making others, then the Axiom of Transitivity will either fail, or fail to apply, across the different comparisons. In particular, if it is FSV that is relevant when comparing A with B, and B with C, and if it is instead SSV that is relevant when comparing A with C, then it will not be surprising if A is better than B, and B better than C, in terms of the criteria that are relevant for making those comparisons, but A is not better than C, in terms of the criteria that are relevant for making that comparison. Thus, Temkin has provided a plausible and powerful explanation of how failures of transitivity can arise when comparing various outcomes, in virtue of the different factors that can be relevant in comparing different outcomes.

Temkin has shown that the same logic that applies when comparing distributions of benefits and burdens across populations also applies when comparing such distributions within a single life. Thus, most believe that an analogue of FSV is relevant for comparing certain possible lives, but that an analogue of SSV is relevant for comparing others. For example, in some cases we accept an additive-aggregationist approach, agreeing that it would be better to live a life with a larger burden lasting for a certain duration, than a life with a burden almost as bad lasting much longer. But in other cases we reject an additive-aggregationist approach, holding, for example, that no matter how long we might live, it would be better to have to listen to one mildly unpleasant pop tune per month for any number of months, than two years of continuous excruciating torture. Two years of torture within a life is tragic. But many mildly unpleasant pop tunes spread out through time never amount to more than a nuisance; they simply do not add up in the way required to outweigh the tragic impact of two years of torture. And yet, as Temkin has shown, these two assumptions about how to evaluate possible lives lead to intransitivities similar to those considered above.

The kinds of argument Temkin gives against transitivity are very broad in their scope. For they will apply whenever the principles that are relevant, or the weight that we should assign to these principles, depends on which outcomes we are comparing. And Temkin has persuasively argued that the relevant principles do vary from comparison to comparison. Thus, there are some "narrowly person-affecting principles," as Temkin calls them, that apply only when one is comparing outcomes in which there is either partial or total overlap among the individuals they contain, whereas there are other principles, such as the principle of total utility, that apply when comparing outcomes containing wholly different populations. Since most people will want to give some weight both to kinds of principles, most people must acknowledge that which principles are relevant in making different comparisons depends on which outcomes are being compared. Temkin has shown, however, that once this kind of variability has been acknowledged, the threat of intransitivity looms.

One objection that has been made to Temkin’s arguments is that, simply as a matter of logic, "better than" could never be intransitive. Such critics often grant, however, that since context is relevant to our obligations, it could be that we ought to do A rather than B, when those are our only alternatives, and do B rather than C, when those are our only alternatives, and yet we ought to do C rather than A, when those are our only alternatives. Temkin has shown, however, that if the critics acknowledge this point about obligations, then it will be very difficult for them to maintain that the "better than" relation is transitive. For it is very plausible that acting rightly is good in itself, quite apart from the value of whatever consequences it may bring about. In order for this to create problems for the defender of transitivity, it need not be the case that, as Kant thought, the intrinsic moral worth of actions is more important than their consequences—it suffices that, when agents act rightly rather than wrongly, this fact has some intrinsic value, however small. Temkin shows that if we grant even this much, then it is very difficult to maintain the transitivity of the value of outcomes, since the intransitivity among our obligations to choose will infect the outcomes we are choosing among.

What these arguments show is that many of our deepest beliefs regarding how to assess the goodness of outcomes are fundamentally incompatible. In light of these arguments, it appears that, if we are to achieve consistency in our normative beliefs, then very serious revisions are required in our understanding of the good and of practical reasoning.

== Works ==
Books

- Inequality, Oxford University Press, 1993.
- Rethinking the Good: Moral Ideals and the Nature of Practical Reasoning, Oxford University Press, 2012.
- Being Good in a World of Need, Oxford University Press, 2022

Articles

- “Justice, Equality, Fairness, Desert, Rights, Free Will, Responsibility, and Luck,” in Distributive Justice and Responsibility, eds. Knight, Carl and Stemplowska, Zofia, forthcoming Oxford University Press.
- “Illuminating Egalitarianism,” in Contemporary Debates in Political Philosophy, edited by Thomas Christiano and John Christman, Wiley-Blackwell Publishing, pp. 155–178, 2009.
- “Aggregation Within Lives,” in Utilitarianism: The Aggregation Question, Social Philosophy and Policy 26, no. 1, eds. Paul, Ellen F., Miller, Fred D., and Paul, Jeffrey, pp. 1–29, Cambridge University Press, 2009; concurrently published in Utilitarianism: The Aggregation Question, eds. Paul, Ellen F., Miller, Fred D., and Paul, Jeffrey, pp. 1–29, Cambridge University Press, 2009.
- “Is Living Longer Living Better,” Journal of Applied Philosophy 25, no. 3, pp. 193–210, 2008.
- “Larry S. Temkin,” in Normative Ethics: 5 Questions, edited by Thomas S. Petersen & Jesper Ryberg, pp. 177–193, Automatic Press/VIP, 2007.
- “Larry S. Temkin,” in Political Questions: 5 Questions on Political Theory, edited by Morten Ebbe Juul Nielsen, pp. 147–167, Automatic Press/VIP, 2006.
- “Equality, Moral and Social [addendum],” Encyclopedia of Philosophy, volume 3, second edition, edited by Donald M. Borchert, pp. 334–337, Macmillan Reference USA, 2005.
- “Parfit, Derek,” Encyclopedia of Philosophy, volume 7, second edition, edited by Donald M. Borchert, pp. 119–121, Macmillan Reference USA, 2005.
- “A ‘New’ Principle of Aggregation,” Philosophical Issues, 15, Normativity, edited by Ernest Sosa and Enrique Villanueva, pp. 218-234, 2005.
- “Welfare, Poverty, and the Needy: A Pluralistic Approach,” in Philosophie und/als Wissenschaft (Philosophy-Science-Scientific Philosophy: Main Lectures and Colloquia of GAP.5), edited by Nimtz, Christian and Beckermann, Ansgar, pp. 147–63, Paderborn, Germany, Mentis Press, 2005.
- “Kagan, Shelly,” in The Oxford Companion to Philosophy, second edition, edited by Ted Honderich, Oxford University Press, forthcoming, p. 465, 2005.
- “Egalitarianism Defended,” Ethics 113, no. 4, 2003, pp. 764–782.
- “Equality, Priority, or What?” Economics and Philosophy 19, no. 1, 2003, pp. 61–88.
- “Worries about Continuity, Transitivity, Expected Utility Theory, and Practical Reasoning" in Exploring Practical Philosophy, eds. Egonsson, Dan, Josefsson Jonas, Petersson, Björn, and Rønnow-Rasmussen, Toni, pp. 95–108, Ashgate Publishing Limited, 2001.
- "Egalitarianism: A Complex, Individualistic, and Comparative Notion," in Philosophical Issues, volume 11, eds. Sosa, Ernie and Villanueva, Enriquea, pp. 327–352, Blackwell Publishers, 2001
- "Equality, Priority, and the Levelling Down Objection," in The Ideal of Equality, eds. Clayton, Matthew and Williams, Andrew, pp. 126–161, Macmillan and St. Martin's Press, 2000.
- "An Abortion Argument and the Threat of Intransitivity," in Well-being and Morality: Essays in Honour of James Griffin, eds. Crisp, Roger and Hooker, Brad, pp. 336–356, Oxford University Press, 2000.
- “Parfit, Derek,” in The Cambridge Dictionary of Philosophy, second edition, ed. Audi, Robert, p. 646, Cambridge University Press, 1999.
- "Intransitivity and the Person-Affecting Principle: A Response," Philosophy and Phenomenological Research, LIX, no. 3, September, 1999, pp. 777–784.
- “Why Should America Care?” Ag Bioethics Forum 11, no. 1, pp. 9–15, June, 1999.
- “Equality and the Human Condition,” in a special issue on Justice, Equality, and Difference of Theoria (South Africa) 92, December, 1998, pp. 15–45.
- "Rethinking the Good, Moral Ideals and the Nature of Practical Reasoning," in Reading Parfit, ed. Dancy, Jonathan, pp. 290–344, Basil Blackwell, 1997.
- "Equality," in The Blackwell Encyclopedic Dictionary of Business Ethics, eds. Freeman, Edward and Werhane, Patricia, pp. 216–219, Blackwell Publishers, 1997 (part of The Blackwell Encyclopedia of Management, eds. Cooper, Gary C., and Argyris, Chris, Blackwell Publishers, 1997).
- "A Continuum Argument for Intransitivity," Philosophy and Public Affairs 25, no. 3, Summer, 1996, pp. 175–210.
- "Justice and Equality: Some Questions about Scope," in Social Philosophy and Policy 12, no. 2, eds. Paul, Ellen F., Miller, Fred D., and Paul, Jeffrey, pp. 72–104, Cambridge University Press, 1995.
- Reprinted in Equality and Justice: Distribution of What?, vol. 3, edited by Peter Vallentyne, pp. 328–360, Routledge, 2003.
- "Weighing Goods: Some Questions and Comments," Philosophy and Public Affairs 23, no. 4, Fall, 1994, pp. 350–380.
- "Harmful Goods, Harmless Bads," in Value, Welfare, and Morality, eds. Frey, R.G. and Morris, Christopher, pp. 290–324, Cambridge University Press, 1993.
- "Intergenerational Inequality," in Philosophy, Politics, and Society, Sixth Series, eds. Laslett, Peter and Fishkin, James, pp. 169–205, Yale University Press, 1992.
- "Arguing for Equality: A Review," Philosophical Review 101, no. 2, 1992, pp. 473–75.
- "Additivity," in Encyclopedia of Ethics, eds. Becker, Lawrence C. and Becker, Charlotte B., pp. 15–18, Garland Press, 1992.
- "Intransitivity and the Mere Addition Paradox," Philosophy and Public Affairs 16, no. 2, Spring, 1987, pp. 138–187.
- "Inequality," Philosophy and Public Affairs 15, no. 2, Spring, 1986, pp. 99–121. Reprinted in Equality and Justice: The Demands of Equality, vol. 2, edited by Peter Vallentyne, pp. 295–318, Routledge, 2003. Reprinted in The Notion of Equality, ed. Hajdin, Mane, International Research Library of Philosophy, pp. 495–517, Ashgate Press, 2001. Reprinted in Equality, eds Pojman, Louis and Westmoreland, Robert, pp. 75–88, Oxford University Press, 1997.
