= Asymmetry (population ethics) =

Concept in population ethics

The Asymmetry, also known as 'the Procreation Asymmetry', is the idea in population ethics that there is a moral or evaluative asymmetry between bringing into existence individuals with good or bad lives. It was first discussed by Jan Narveson in 1967, and Jeff McMahan coined the term 'the Asymmetry' in 1981. McMahan formulates the Asymmetry as follows: "while the fact that a person's life would be worse than no life at all ... constitutes a strong moral reason for not bringing him into existence, the fact that a person's life would be worth living provides no (or only a relatively weak) moral reason for bringing him into existence." Professor Nils Holtug formulates the Asymmetry evaluatively in terms of the value of outcomes instead of in terms of moral reasons. Holtug's formulation says that "while it detracts from the value of an outcome to add individuals whose lives are of overall negative value, it does not increase the value of an outcome to add individuals whose lives are of overall positive value."

Much of the literature on the ethics of procreation deals with the Asymmetry. A number of authors have defended the Asymmetry, and a number of authors have argued against it. Many who defend the asymmetry appeal to its intuitiveness. However, more elaborated defences of the asymmetry have been yielded. For instance, Jan Narveson argues that:

If we cause a miserable child to come into existence, there will exist a child who will have a justified complaint, while if we refrain from causing a happy child to come into existence, this child will not exist and so can have no complaint.

Against Narverson's argument, Timothy Sprigge has claimed that if we give a miserable child a genuine reason to complain by bringing her into existence we also give a happy child a genuine reason to be grateful. Professor Sprigge's argument highlights that Narveson's claim does not explain why the future of the miserable child is special but the future of the happy child is not special in the same way. Parfit solves this issue by holding these views:

(1) appeal to the Person-affecting Restriction, (2) claim that causing someone to exist can be either good or bad for him, and (3) appeal to the Narrow Principle. According to the Narrow Principle, it is wrong, if other things are equal, to do what would be either bad for, or worse for, the people who ever live. It is therefore wrong to have the Wretched Child, since this would be bad for him. But it is in no way wrong to fail to have the Happy Child.

The Narrow principle justifies Narveson's defence of the asymmetry. However, this has been contested. For instance, Nils Holtug holds that the asymmetry is incompatible with a person-affecting solution to the nonidentity problem and, in addition, it is counterintuitive in another case. Suppose that in the future the last inhabitants of the earth can populate the world again or refrain from procreating and thus bring an end to the human race. Whatever they do, these already existing individuals will be equally happy. Even if they could bring billions of happy individuals into existence, there would surely be a few of them whose existence would be miserable and, hence, given the asymmetry they should bring about the end of the human race since the happiness of those possible billions of individuals counts for nothing compared to the suffering of those who would have miserable lives. To avoid this radical separation between happiness and suffering, Holtug appeals instead to the Weak Asymmetry:

Everything else being equal, it is better to avoid that a person comes into existence and has a life worth not living (at level –n), than to ensure that a person comes into existence and has a life worth living (at level n).

This allows to give extra weight to the badness of bringing miserable lives into existence but also allows to outweigh small quantities by much larger ones when comparing suffering and happiness.

== See also ==
- Antifrustrationism
- Antinatalism
- Benatar's asymmetry argument
- Natalism
- Negative Consequentialism
- Negative Utilitarianism
- Person-affecting view
- Suffering-focused ethics
