= Narveson (surname) =

Origin
- Origin: Norwegian / Old Norse
- Meaning: Likely "son of Narve" (from the Old Norse personal name Njarfi / Narfi)
- Region of origin: Norway; Scandinavian diaspora

Other names
- Variant forms: Narverson, Narvesson, Narvesen, Narvesen, Narveson

Narveson is a Norwegian surname, patronymic in origin, meaning "son of Narve" (from Old Norse Njarfi or Narfi). It is found primarily in Norway and among descendants of Norwegian immigrants in North America.

Notable people with the surname Narveson include:

- Brayden Narveson (born 1999), American football player
- Chris Narveson (born 1981), American baseball player
- Jan Narveson (born 1936), Canadian philosopher and libertarian theorist

== See also ==
- Narvesen (surname)
