= Derek Parfit =

British philosopher (1942–2017)

Derek Parfit FBA
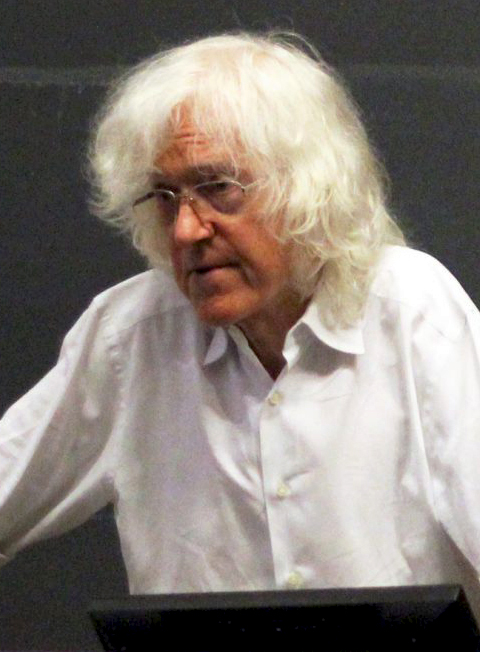
- Parfit at Harvard in 2015
- Born: Derek Antony Parfit; 11 December 1942; Chengdu, China
- Died: 2 January 2017 (aged 74); London, England
- Spouse: Janet Radcliffe Richards (m. 2010)
- Awards: Rolf Schock Prize (2014)

Education
- Education: Balliol College, Oxford
- Doctoral advisor: Alan Montefiore
- Other advisor: David Pears

Philosophical work
- Era: Contemporary philosophy
- Region: Western philosophy
- School: Analytic philosophy; Consequentialism
- Institutions: All Souls College, Oxford
- Doctoral students: Ruth Chang; Roger Crisp; Brad Hooker; Julia Markovits; Jeff McMahan; Toby Ord; Larry Temkin
- Main interests: Ethics; personal identity; rationality; philosophy of mind
- Notable works: Reasons and Persons (1984)
- Notable ideas: Relation R; further facts; repugnant conclusion; nonidentity problem; Triple Theory; teletransportation paradox; self-defeating moral theories

Derek Antony Parfit (/ˈpɑːrfɪt/; 11 December 1942 – 2 January 2017) was a British philosopher who specialised in personal identity, rationality, and ethics. He is widely considered one of the most important and influential moral philosophers of the late 20th and early 21st centuries.

Parfit rose to prominence in 1971 with the publication of his first paper, "Personal Identity". His first book, Reasons and Persons (1984), has been described as the most significant work of moral philosophy since the 1800s. His second book, On What Matters (2011), was widely circulated and discussed for many years before its publication.

For his entire academic career, Parfit worked at the University of Oxford, where he was an Emeritus Senior Research Fellow at All Souls College at the time of his death. He was also a visiting professor of philosophy at Harvard University, New York University, and Rutgers University. He was awarded the 2014 Rolf Schock Prize "for his groundbreaking contributions concerning personal identity, regard for future generations, and analysis of the structure of moral theories."

== Early life and education ==
Parfit was born in 1942 in Chengdu, China, the son of Jessie (née Browne) and Norman Parfit, medical doctors who had moved to Western China to teach preventive medicine in missionary hospitals. The family returned to the United Kingdom about a year after Parfit was born, settling in Oxford. Parfit was educated at the Dragon School and Eton College, where he was nearly always at the top of the regular rankings in every subject except mathematics. From an early age, he endeavoured to become a poet, but he gave up poetry towards the end of his adolescence.

He then studied modern history at Balliol College, Oxford, graduating in 1964. In 1965–66, he was a Harkness Fellow and took courses at The New School, New York University, Columbia University, and Harvard University. During these years, he met, among others, John Rawls, Stuart Hampshire, and Robert Paul Wolff. He abandoned historical studies for philosophy during the fellowship.

== Career ==
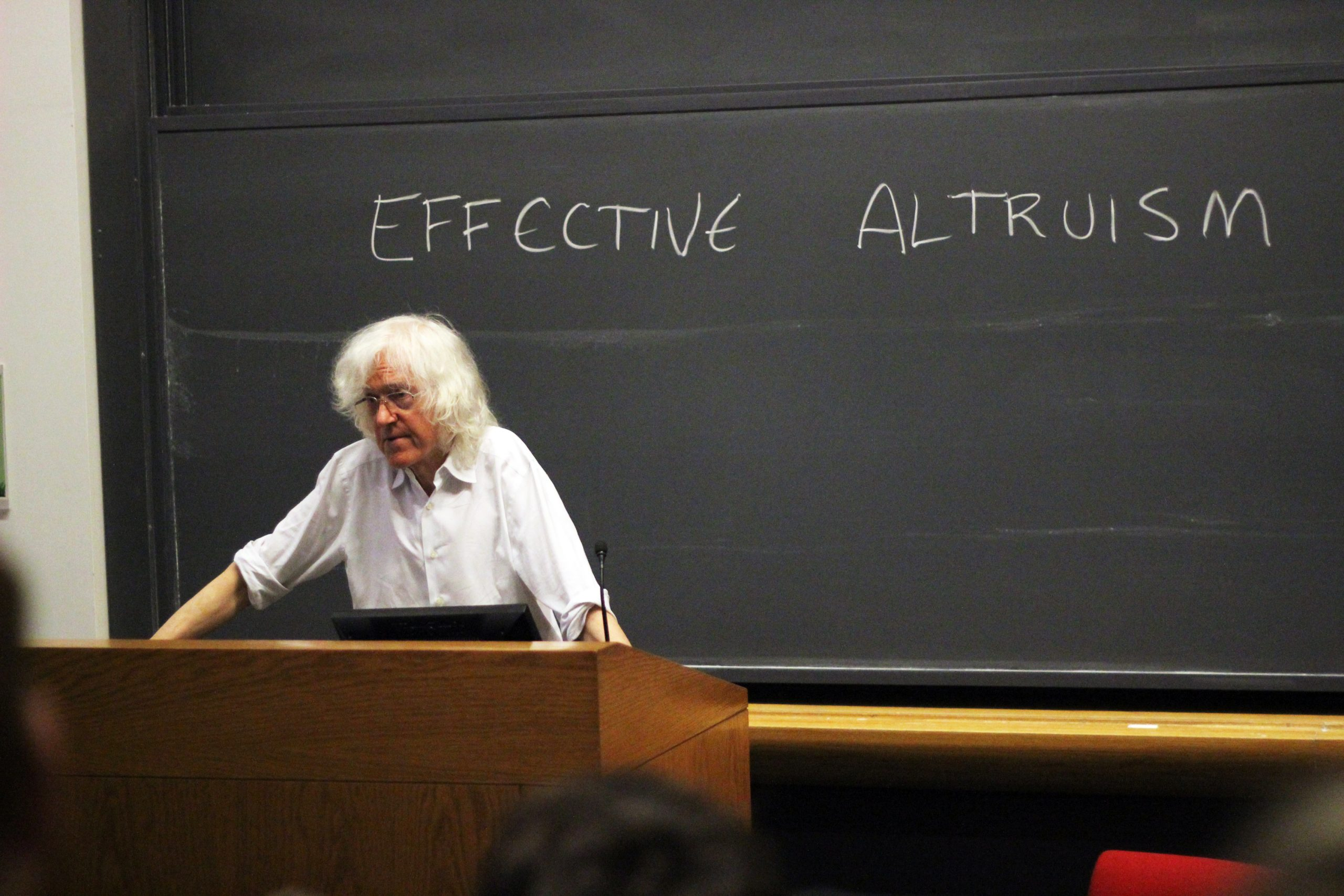
Parfit at Harvard University in April 2015

After his Harkness Fellowship, Parfit returned to Oxford to start his BPhil in philosophy, and became a fellow of All Souls College. He held this position until age 67, at which point university policy mandates retirement. He remained a regular visiting professor at Harvard, New York University, and Rutgers.

== Ethics and rationality ==
=== Reasons and Persons ===
In Reasons and Persons, Parfit suggested that nonreligious ethics is a young and fertile field of inquiry. He asked questions about which actions are right or wrong and shied away from meta-ethics, which is more concerned with logic and language.

In Part I of Reasons and Persons Parfit discussed self-defeating moral theories, namely the self-interest theory of rationality ("S") and two ethical frameworks: common-sense morality and consequentialism. He posited that self-interest has been dominant in Western culture for over two millennia, often making bedfellows with religious doctrine, which united self-interest and morality. Because self-interest demands that we always make self-interest our supreme rational concern and instructs us to ensure that our whole life goes as well as possible, self-interest makes temporally neutral requirements. Thus it would be irrational to act in ways that we know we would prefer later to undo.

As an example, it would be irrational for fourteen-year-olds to listen to loud music or get arrested for vandalism if they knew such actions would detract significantly from their future well-being and goals (such as having good hearing, a good job, or an academic career in philosophy).

Most notably, the self-interest theory holds that it is irrational to commit any acts of self-denial or to act on desires that negatively affect our well-being. One may consider an aspiring author whose strongest desire is to write a masterpiece, but who, in doing so, suffers depression and lack of sleep. Parfit argues that it is plausible that we have such desires which conflict with our own well-being, and that it is not necessarily irrational to act to fulfill these desires.

Aside from the initial appeal to plausibility of desires that do not directly contribute to one's life going well, Parfit contrived situations where self-interest is indirectly self-defeating—that is, it makes demands that it initially posits as irrational. It does not fail on its own terms, but it does recommend adoption of an alternative framework of rationality. For instance, it might be in my self-interest to become trustworthy to participate in mutually beneficial agreements, even though in maintaining the agreement I will be doing what will, other things being equal, be worse for me. In many cases self-interest instructs us precisely not to follow self-interest, thus fitting the definition of an indirectly self-defeating theory.

Parfit contended that to be indirectly individually self-defeating and directly collectively self-defeating is not fatally damaging for S. To further bury self-interest, he exploited its partial relativity, juxtaposing temporally neutral demands against agent-centred demands. The appeal to full relativity raises the question whether a theory can be consistently neutral in one sphere of actualisation but entirely partial in another. Stripped of its commonly accepted shrouds of plausibility that can be shown to be inconsistent, self-interest can be judged on its own merits. While Parfit did not offer an argument to dismiss S outright, his exposition lays self-interest bare and allows its own failings to show through. It is defensible, but the defender must bite so many bullets that they might lose their credibility in the process. Thus a new theory of rationality is necessary. Parfit offered the "critical present aim theory", a broad catch-all that can be formulated to accommodate any competing theory. He constructed critical present aim to exclude self-interest as our overriding rational concern and to allow the time of action to become critically important. But he left open whether it should include "to avoid acting wrongly" as our highest concern. Such an inclusion would pave the way for ethics. Henry Sidgwick longed for the fusion of ethics and rationality, and while Parfit admitted that many would avoid acting irrationally more ardently than acting immorally, he could not construct an argument that adequately united the two.

Where self-interest puts too much emphasis on the separateness of persons, consequentialism fails to recognise the importance of bonds and emotional responses that come from allowing some people privileged positions in one's life. If we were all pure do-gooders, perhaps following Sidgwick, that would not constitute the outcome that would maximise happiness. It would be better if a small percentage of the population were pure do-gooders, but others acted out of love, etc. Thus consequentialism too makes demands of agents that it initially deemed immoral; it fails not on its own terms, for it still demands the outcome that maximises total happiness, but does demand that each agent not always act as an impartial happiness promoter. Consequentialism thus needs to be revised as well.

Self-interest and consequentialism fail indirectly, while common-sense morality is directly collectively self-defeating. (So is self-interest, but self-interest is an individual theory.) Parfit showed, using interesting examples and borrowing from Nashian games, that it would often be better for us all if we did not put the welfare of our loved ones before all else. For example, we should care not only about our own children, but everyone's children.

=== On What Matters ===
In his second book, Parfit argues for moral realism, insisting that moral questions have true and false answers. Further, he suggests that three categories of ethical theory—Kantian deontology, consequentalism, and contractualism—converge on the same answers to moral questions.

In the conclusion of the third volume, published shortly after his death, Parfit writes that the affluent have strong moral obligations to the poor:

One thing that greatly matters is the failure of we rich people to prevent, as we so easily could, much of the suffering and many of the early deaths of the poorest people in the world. The money that we spend on an evening's entertainment might instead save some poor person from death, blindness, or chronic and severe pain. If we believe that, in our treatment of these poorest people, we are not acting wrongly, we are like those who believed that they were justified in having slaves. Some of us ask how much of our wealth we rich people ought to give to these poorest people. But that question wrongly assumes that our wealth is ours to give. This wealth is legally ours. But these poorest people have much stronger moral claims to some of this wealth. We ought to transfer to these people [...] at least ten per cent of what we earn.

He also concludes that responding to risks to humanity's survival is what "matters most", with humanity's descendants or successors having the potential to spread through the galaxy and create unprecedented good over billions of years.

=== Criticism ===
In his book On Human Nature, Roger Scruton criticised Parfit's use of moral dilemmas such as the trolley problem and lifeboat ethics to support his ethical views, writing, "These 'dilemmas' have the useful character of eliminating from the situation just about every morally relevant relationship and reducing the problem to one of arithmetic alone." Scruton believed that many of them are deceptive; for example, he does not believe one must be a consequentialist to believe that it is morally required to pull the switch in the trolley problem, as Parfit assumes. He instead suggests that more complex dilemmas, such as Anna Karenina's choice to leave her husband and child for Vronsky, are needed to fully express the differences between opposing ethical theories, and suggests that deontology is free of the problems that (in Scruton's view) beset Parfit's theory.

== Personal identity ==
Parfit was singular in his meticulously rigorous and almost mathematical investigations into personal identity. In some cases, he used examples seemingly inspired by Star Trek and other science fiction, such as the teletransporter, to explore our intuitions about our identity. He was a reductionist, believing that since there is no adequate criterion of personal identity, people do not exist apart from their components. Parfit argued that reality can be fully described impersonally: there need not be a determinate answer to the question "Will I continue to exist?" We could know all the facts about a person's continued existence and not be able to say whether the person has survived. He concluded that we are mistaken in assuming that personal identity is what matters in survival; what matters is rather "Relation R": psychological connectedness (namely, of memory and character) and continuity (overlapping chains of strong connectedness).

Following David Hume, Parfit argued that no unique entity, such as a self, unifies a person's experiences and dispositions over time. Therefore personal identity is not "what matters" in survival.

A key Parfitian question is: given the choice between surviving without psychological continuity and connectedness (Relation R) and dying but preserving R through someone else's future existence, which would you choose? Parfit argues the latter is preferable.

Parfit described his loss of belief in a separate self as liberating:

My life seemed like a glass tunnel, through which I was moving faster every year, and at the end of which there was darkness. When I changed my view, the walls of my glass tunnel disappeared. I now live in the open air. There is still a difference between my life and the lives of other people. But the difference is less. Other people are closer. I am less concerned about the rest of my own life, and more concerned about the lives of others.

=== Criticism of personal identity view ===
Mark Johnston rejects Parfit's constitutive notion of identity with what he calls an "Argument from Above". Johnston maintains, "Even if the lower-level facts [that make up identity] do not in themselves matter, the higher-level fact may matter. If it does, the lower-level facts will have derived significance. They will matter, not in themselves, but because they constitute the higher level fact."

In this, Johnston moves to preserve the significance of personhood. Parfit's explanation is that it is not personhood itself that matters, but rather the facts in which personhood consists that provide it with significance. To illustrate this difference between himself and Johnston, Parfit used an illustration of a brain-damaged patient who becomes irreversibly unconscious. The patient is certainly still alive even though that fact is separate from the fact that his heart is still beating and other organs are still functioning. But the fact that the patient is alive is not an independent or separately obtaining fact. The patient's being alive, even though irreversibly unconscious, simply consists in the other facts. Parfit explains that from this so-called "Argument from Below" we can arbitrate the value of the heart and other organs still working without having to assign them derived significance, as Johnston's perspective would dictate.

== Population ethics and future generations ==
=== Non-identity problem ===
The non-identity problem arises from the observation that actions taken today can fundamentally alter which future people come into existence. In chapter 16 of Reasons and Persons, Parfit posits that one's existence is intimately related to the time and conditions of one's conception. He calls this "The Time-Dependence Claim": "If any particular person had not been conceived when he was in fact conceived, it is in fact true that he would never have existed". Like the butterfly effect in chaos theory, small changes in initial conditions can have profound downstream effects on human reproduction. Actions may not just affect the welfare of future individuals, but also cause different individuals to be born. If the moral ramifications of potential policies are considered in person-affecting terms, there is no reason to prefer a sound policy over an unsound one, provided that its effects are not felt by the next few generations.

Parfit eventually became convinced that personal identity is irrelevant to ethics. He wrote about an article in The Times in which a politician praised a recent decline in teenage pregnancy. A man wrote a letter saying he had had a teenage mother and, although the early years had been hard, he now had a life thoroughly worth living. The man asked whether the politician was suggesting it would have been better if he had never been born. Parfit said the man was not wronged by his mother since he was glad to be alive, but argued that it would have been better if she had waited to be mature, as "she could have given to some other child a better start in life".

=== Mere addition paradox and repugnant conclusion ===
In part four of Reasons and Persons, Parfit discusses possible futures for the world. He discusses possible futures and population growth in chapter 17, and argues that both average and total utilitarianism result in unwelcome conclusions when applied to population.

In the section titled "Overpopulation", Parfit distinguishes between average utilitarianism and total utilitarianism. He formulates average utilitarianism in two ways. One is what Parfit calls the "Impersonal Average Principle", which he formulates as "If other things are equal, the best outcome is the one in which people's lives go, on average, best." The other is what he calls the "Hedonistic version"; he formulates this as "If other things are equal, the best outcome is the one in which there is the greatest average net sum of happiness, per life lived." Parfit then gives two formulations of the total utilitarianism view. The first formulation Parfit calls the "Hedonistic version of the Impersonal Total Principle": "If other things are equal, the best outcome is the one in which there would be the greatest quantity of happiness—the greatest net sum of happiness minus misery." He then describes the other formulation, the "non-Hedonistic Impersonal Total Principle": "If other things are equal, the best outcome is the one in which there would be the greatest quantity of whatever makes life worth living."

The width of each bar represents the size of a population, and the height represents the individual welfare level. The mere addition from A to B results in a larger population with a lower individual welfare.

The "repugnant conclusion" involves repeating the mere addition until obtaining a much larger population Z with only slightly positive individual welfare.

Applying total utilitarian standards (absolute total happiness) to possible population growth and welfare leads to what he calls the repugnant conclusion: "For any possible population of at least ten billion people, all with a very high quality of life, there must be some much larger imaginable population whose existence, if other things are equal, would be better, even though its members have lives that are barely worth living." Parfit illustrates this with a simple thought experiment: imagine a choice between two possible futures. In A, 10 billion people would live during the next generation, all with extremely happy lives, lives far happier than anyone's today. In B, there are 20 billion people all living lives that, while slightly less happy than those in A, are still very happy. Under total utility maximisation we should prefer B to A. Therefore, through a regressive process of population increases and happiness decreases (in each pair of cases the happiness decrease is outweighed by the population increase) we are forced to prefer Z, a world of hundreds of billions of people all living lives barely worth living, to A. Even if we do not hold that coming to exist can benefit someone, we still must at least admit that Z is no worse than A.

Parfit and other philosophers have explored a number of potential ways to avoid this "repugnant conclusion", many of which are discussed in Reasons and Persons. Parfit himself spent significant time trying to find a coherent ethical theory that would avoid it. One potential objection challenges what life in the A-world would be like and whether life in the Z-world would differ very much from a normal privileged life. Another one proposes that movement from the A-world to the Z-world can be blocked by discontinuity. Negative utilitarians may reject the premise of maximizing happiness, emphasizing the converse, the minimization of suffering. Philosopher Larry Temkin challenges the assumption that the "better than" relation is transitive. Others proposed a minimal threshold of liberties and primary social goods to be distributed, or suggested to adopt a deontological approach that looks to values and their transmission through time. Michael Huemer and Torbjörn Tännsjö endorse the conclusion, considering that the repugnance comes from intuitions that should be revised. In 2021, a number of philosophers said that avoiding the repugnant conclusion was receiving excessive focus and should not be considered a necessary condition for an adequate theory of population ethics.

Against average utilitarianism, Parfit also argues that if all that matters is average happiness, then the best population could be arbitrarily small, for example containing only a few extremely happy individuals. Moreover, this would imply that adding people with lives worth living would make the world worse if these are less happy than the average.

== Personal life ==
Parfit met Janet Radcliffe Richards in 1982, and they then began a relationship that lasted until his death. They married in 2010. Richards believes Parfit had Asperger syndrome.

Parfit was an avid photographer who regularly traveled to Venice and Saint Petersburg to photograph architecture. He supported effective altruism, and was a member of Giving What We Can and pledged to donate at least 10% of his income to effective charities.

Parfit died at his home in London on January 2, 2017 at the age of 74.

== Selected works ==
- 1964: Eton Microcosm. Edited by Anthony Cheetham and Derek Parfit. London: Sidgwick & Jackson.
- 1971: "Personal Identity". Philosophical Review. vol. 80: 3–27. JSTOR 2184309
- 1979: "Is Common-Sense Morality Self-Defeating?". The Journal of Philosophy, vol. 76, pp. 533–545, October. JSTOR 2025548
- 1984: Reasons and Persons. Oxford: Clarendon Press. ISBN 0-19-824615-3
- 1992: "Against the social discount rate" (with Tyler Cowen), in Peter Laslett & James S. Fishkin (eds.) Justice between age groups and generations, New Haven: Yale University Press, pp. 144–161.
- 1997: "Reasons and Motivation". The Aristotelian Soc. Supp., vol. 77: 99–130. JSTOR 4106956
- 2003: Parfit, Derek (2003). "Justifiability to each person". Ratio. 16 (4): 368–390. doi:10.1046/j.1467-9329.2003.00229.x.
- 2006: "Normativity", in Russ Shafer-Landau (ed.). Oxford Studies in Metaethics, vol. I. Oxford: Clarendon Press.
- 2011: On What Matters, vols. 1 and 2. Oxford University Press. ISBN 978-0-19-957280-9 and ISBN 978-0-19-957281-6
- 2017: On What Matters, vol. 3. Oxford University Press. ISBN 978-0-19-877860-8

== See also ==
- British philosophy
