= Thandika Mkandawire =

Malawian economist (1940–2020)

- Born: 10 October 1940; Zimbabwe
- Died: 27 March 2020 (aged 79); Stockholm, Sweden

Academic background
- Education: Ohio State University (B.A., M.A.)

Academic work
- Discipline: Development theory Economic and social policy
- Institutions: List: London School of Economics United Nations Research Institute for Social Development Council for the Development of Social Science Research in Africa Swedish Institute for Futures Studies

Thandika Mkandawire (10 October 1940 – 27 March 2020) was a Malawian economist and public intellectual who was the inaugural Chair of African Development and professor of African Development at the London School of Economics and Political Science. He was a widely published scholar on the social sciences in Africa. His research focused in development theory and economic and social policy.

== Personal life ==
He was born in Zimbabwe to a Malawian father and Zimbabwean mother. He spent much of his early childhood in Zambia but later moved to Malawi as an adolescent.

== Career ==
Mkandawire received his Bachelor of Arts and Master of Arts degrees in Economics at Ohio State University.

Mkandawire worked as a professor at the universities of Stockholm and Zimbabwe.

He later served as a Director of the United Nations Research Institute for Social Development and Director of the Council for the Development of Social Science Research in Africa CODESRIA. He was on the board of the Social Science Research Council.

Thandika Mkandawire was awarded honorary degrees by the University of Helsinki, University of Ghana and York University. He was the inaugural Chair and Professor of African Development at the LSE. He was Olof Palme Professor for Peace with the Swedish Institute for Futures Studies.

== Death ==
Thandika Mkandawire died in Stockholm, Sweden, on 27 March 2020, aged 79, following a stroke in January the same year.

== Publications ==
- Mkandawire, Thandika ed. 2004 Social Policy in a Development Context. Basingstoke: Palgrave Macmillan.
- Mkandawire, Thandika, 2007. "Targeting and Universalism in Poverty Reduction," in Policy Matters: Economic and Social Policies to sustain equitable development. Jose Antonio Ocampo, Jomo K. Sundaram, and Sarbuland Khan eds. Hyderabad/London/Penang: Orient/Longmans/Zed Books/TWN.
- Mkandawire, Thandika, 2011. "Institutional Monocropping and Monotasking in Africa," in Good Growth and Governance in Africa: Rethinking Development Strategies -Akbar Noman, Kwesi Botchwey, Howard Stein, and Joseph E. Stiglitz. ISBN 9780199698561.
- Mkandawire, Thandika, 2005 African Intellectuals: Rethinking Politics, Language, Gender and Development. Zed Books.
