= Julia Markovits =

American philosopher (born 1979)

- Born: 1979 (age 46–47)

Education
- Education: University of Oxford (PhD)
- Thesis: Kantian internalism (2006)
- Doctoral advisor: Derek Parfit

Philosophical work
- Era: Contemporary philosophy
- Region: Western philosophy
- Institutions: Cornell University; MIT
- Main interests: Metaethics, normative ethics, bioethics, philosophy of law

Julia Markovits (born 1979) is an American philosopher and associate professor of philosophy at Cornell University. Previously she taught in the Department of Linguistics and Philosophy at the Massachusetts Institute of Technology (2009-2014). Markovits is known for her works on moral philosophy.

== Books ==
- Moral Reason, Oxford University Press, 2014, 208pp., ISBN 978-0-19-956717-1.
