= On What Matters =

2011–2017 book by Derek Parfit

- Author: Derek Parfit
- Language: English
- Subject: Ethics
- Publisher: Oxford University Press
- Publication date: 26 May 2011
- Media type: Print (Hardcover)
- Pages: 1,928
- ISBN: 978-0-19-926592-3

On What Matters is a three-volume book of moral philosophy by Derek Parfit. The first two volumes were published in 2011 and the third in 2017. It is a follow-up to Parfit's 1984 book Reasons and Persons. It has an introduction by Samuel Scheffler.

== Summary ==
Parfit defends an objective ethical theory and suggests that we have reasons to act that cannot be accounted for by subjective ethical theories. Furthermore, it attempts to present a moral theory that combines three traditional approaches in moral and political philosophy: Kantian deontology, consequentialism, and contractualism (of the sort advocated by T. M. Scanlon, and from the tradition of Thomas Hobbes, John Locke, Jean-Jacques Rousseau and John Rawls). According to Parfit, these theories converge rather than disagree, "climbing the same mountain on different sides", in Parfit's metaphor.

Parfit labels his synthesis of these three ethical theories the "Triple Theory":

An act is wrong if and only if, or just when, such acts are disallowed by some principle that is

1. one of the principles whose being universal laws would make things go best,
2. one of the only principles whose being universal laws everyone could rationally will....
3. a principle that no one could reasonably reject.

On Parfit's view, these three criteria (a) represent the best versions of consequentialism, Kantian ethics, and contractualism respectively, and (b) should generally agree in their recommendations. Both claims have proven controversial.

== Writing ==
The manuscript, originally titled Climbing the Mountain, circulated for many years prior to publication, and occasioned a great deal of excitement, including reading groups and a conference prior to publication.

Some of On What Matters is derived from lectures given at the University of California, Berkeley as part of the Tanner Lectures on Human Values in 2002. As part of that series at Berkeley, Parfit's lectures were responded to by Allen W. Wood, T. M. Scanlon and Susan Wolf.

== Reception ==
The economist Tyler Cowen has expressed admiration for Parfit's style ("Reading him is an unforgettable and illuminating experience") in On What Matters, but argues:

I see the biggest and most central part of the book as a failure, possibly wrong but more worryingly "not even wrong" and simply missing the questions defined by where the frontier – choice theory and not just philosophic ethics – has been for some time.

Peter Singer was far more positive, saying that Parfit's arguments "put those who reject objectivism in ethics on the defensive".

Constantine Sandis raises an objection to Parfit's project: the various "theories may well converge on their recommendations, but to think that the actions that follow from them are all that matters is to already presuppose the truth of consequentialism". Sandis jokes that the significance of Parfit's work, despite his scant publication record, should cause us to question the "publish or perish" demands of the Research Excellence Framework, but "whether it will change the way we think about morality remains to be seen".

The sheer length of time Parfit took to write the text, and the increasing incompatibility of such extended work with the demands of academic life, was raised by Nigel Thrift, vice-chancellor of the University of Warwick, in a blog post on the Chronicle of Higher Education website:

Parfit's life has been able to be intellectually uncompromising because he found the infrastructure – especially All Souls College in Oxford, which does no undergraduate teaching – that allowed it to be. But I wonder how much longer that kind of infrastructure will be available in all but a few universities.

The philosopher Roger Scruton questioned the appropriateness of the title of the book, writing in 2015 "Nothing that really matters to human beings – their loves, responsibilities, attachments, their delights, aesthetic values, and spiritual needs – occurs in Parfit’s interminable narrative. All is swept into a corner by the great broom of utilitarian reasoning, to be left there in a heap of dust".
