= Non-identity problem =

Concept in population ethics

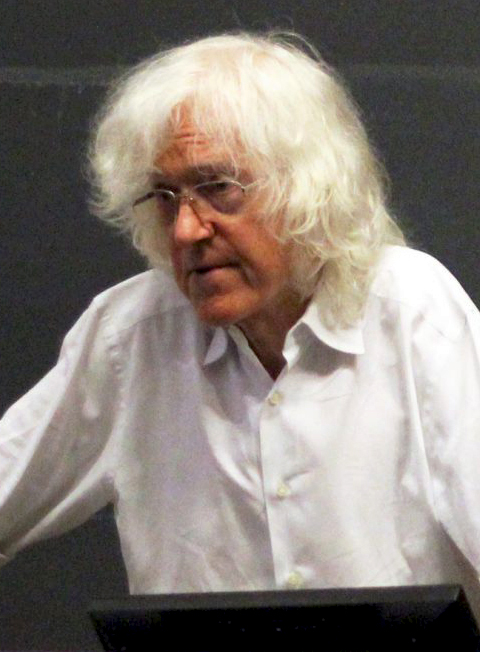
Derek Parfit, who first outlined the problem in 1984.

The non-identity problem (also called the paradox of future individuals) is a problem in population ethics concerning actions that affect the existence, identity, or well-being of future people. It arises from the observation that even small changes can alter the timing and circumstances of child conception, leading to entirely different individuals coming into existence, similarly to the butterfly effect in chaos theory. Actions affecting future generations will thus not simply affect the welfare of individuals, but rather cause different individuals to come into existence. The problem was described and explored by Derek Parfit in his 1984 book Reasons and Persons. It is a challenge to person-affecting views, which are based on the intuition that "what is bad must be bad for someone".

An example proposed by Parfit involves thinking of two policies: "conservation" and "depletion". In the depletion strategy, current generations have a slightly higher quality of life, but unchecked use of natural resources eventually leads to depletion, significantly degrading the welfare of future generations. Parfit argues that person-affecting views would favor the depletion policy because it benefits current generations of identifiable people, even though the conservation policy is generally considered ethically superior. He eventually became convinced that personal identity is irrelevant to ethics.

A solution to the problem is to adopt impersonal views, theories that don't rely on the notion of personal identity, such as utilitarianism. But impersonal views lead to what Parfit calls the "repugnant conclusion", the idea that for any possible population with very high quality of life, there could be a much larger imaginable population whose existence would be better, even though its members have lives that are barely worth living. Some philosophers consider, however, that almost all credible theories of population ethics imply some form of the repugnant conclusion anyway.

"Non-identity reasoning" can be sustained by a range of compatible theories of identity such as versions of origin essentialism as well as actualism and thisness.

== Additional applications ==
The non-identity problem and non-identity reasoning more generally have been employed beyond the non-identity problem itself.

=== Philosophy of religion ===
Non-identity reasoning has been employed in philosophy of religion to address the problem of evil and the hiddenness argument. The basic contribution in both cases is that particular persons can only come into existence under certain circumstances, which include evil and nonresistant nonbelief, even on God's existence.

=== Longtermism ===
Longtermism, which centers on the idea that future people have moral worth and that this should affect our decisions, is affected by the non-identity problem. Specifically, since the identities of future people are altered depending on what we do today, then they do not have any claim on our help today—at least as long as their lives are overall worth living. This parallels Parfit's conservation vs. depletion case in a way specific to longtermism.

== See also ==
- Mere addition paradox
- Natalism
- Antinatalism
