= Janet Radcliffe Richards =

British philosopher (born 1944)

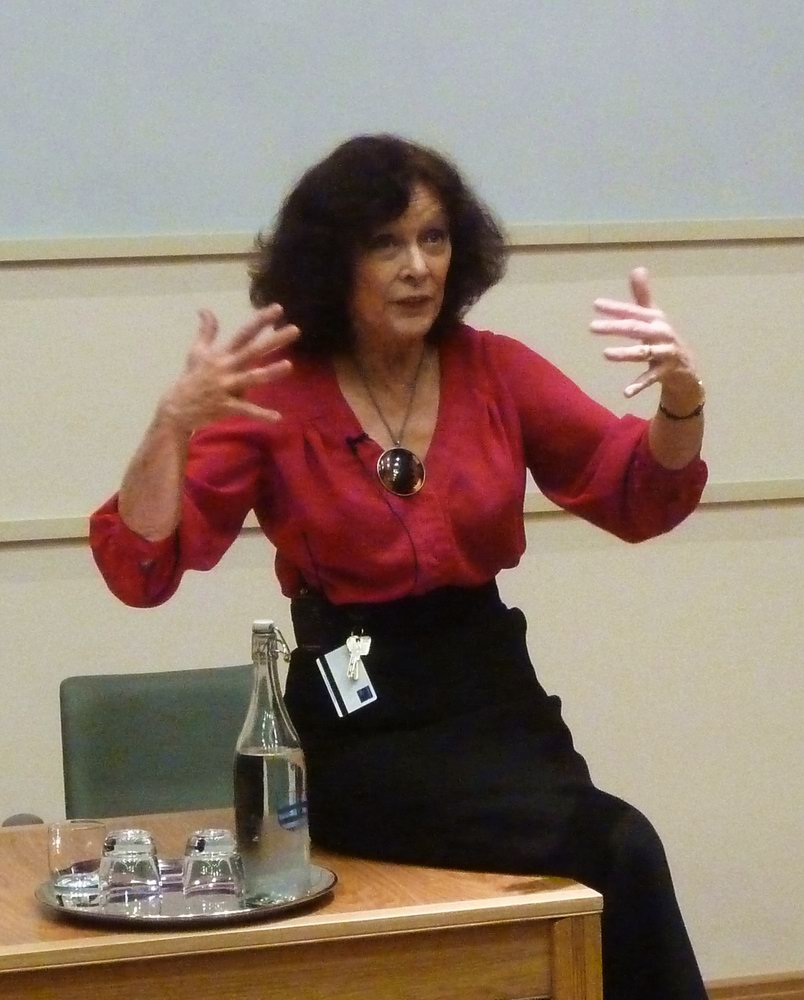
- Giving the 2012 Annual Uehiro Lecture at Merton College, Oxford
- Born: 1944 (age 81–82)
- Education: Keele University; University of Oxford; Calgary University
- Occupations: Professor of Practical Philosophy at the University of Oxford; Research fellow and consultant at the Oxford Uehiro Centre for Practical Ethics
- Spouse: Derek Parfit (m. 2010; died 2017)

Janet Radcliffe Richards (born 1944) is a British philosopher specialising in bioethics and feminism and Professor of Practical Philosophy at the University of Oxford. She is the author of The Sceptical Feminist (1980), Philosophical Problems of Equality (1995), Human Nature after Darwin (2000), and The Ethics of Transplants (2012).

== Biography ==
Richards earned a bachelor's degree from Keele University, a B.Phil from the University of Oxford, and a master's degree from the University of Calgary.

Richards was lecturer in Philosophy at the Open University 1979–1999, and Director of the Centre for Bioethics and Philosophy of Medicine at University College London until 2007. Since 2008, she has been Professor of Practical Philosophy at Oxford University.

She was in a relationship with philosopher Derek Parfit from 1982, and they were married from 2010 until his death in 2017.

== Work ==
Richards is the author of several books, papers and articles, and has sat on a variety of advisory and working committees in areas of philosophy and bioethics. She is also a Distinguished Research Fellow at the Oxford Uehiro Centre for Practical Ethics.

Her identification with feminism and her focus on bioethics both occurred "by accident" during the writing of her first book, The Sceptical Feminist: A Philosophical Enquiry (Routledge, 1980; Penguin, 1982) – bioethics being central to the abortion debate. The book proved to be controversial within and without feminism, e.g. in regard to standards of rationality, fashion and style, and her liberal stance.

Her second book, Human Nature After Darwin: A Philosophical Introduction (Routledge, 2001) explores the so-called Darwin Wars, including what implications Darwinism raises for philosophy and the application of critical thinking to various arguments put forward in the debate. It was originally written as an introduction to philosophical techniques for Open University students using the controversies relating to Darwinian thinking and human nature.

Since April 2014, Richards is a member of Giving What We Can, a community of people who have pledged to give at least 10% of their income to effective charities.

== Bibliography ==
- The Sceptical Feminist: A Philosophical Enquiry, Routledge, (1980)
- Human Nature After Darwin: A Philosophical Introduction, Routledge, (2001)
- "Why Feminist Epistemology Isn't" (1997) in The Flight from Science and Reason P. Gross, N. Levitt & M. Lewis; Johns Hopkins University Press.
- "Organs For Sale", Janet Radcliffe Richards, Issues Med Ethics. 2001 April–June;9(2)
