= Mark Johnston (philosopher) =

Australian philosopher (born 1954)

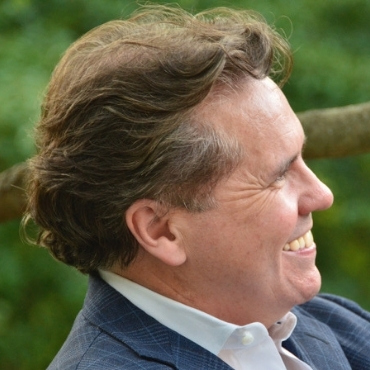
Photograph of Johnston

Mark Johnston (born 1954) is an Australian philosopher working at Princeton University. He has made contributions in fields including ontology, philosophy of mind, epistemology, and value theory.

== Biography and career ==
In 1980, after his undergraduate degree at the University of Melbourne, Johnston came to Princeton University to work with Saul Kripke and David Lewis, arguably the two most influential anglophone philosophers in the late 20th century. Under their supervision he completed his dissertation Particulars and Persistence in 1984. He became an assistant professor at Princeton in 1984, received tenure there in 1987, and became a full professor in 1991. From 2005-2015 he was the Walter Cerf Professor of Philosophy. He is presently Henry Putnam University Professor at Princeton University.

Johnston has been a visiting professor at the Australian National University, Monash University, Melbourne University, New York University and U.C. Berkeley. His distinguished invited lectureships include the Presidential Lectureship at the University of Southern California (1993), the Kolnai Lectureship at The Central European University (1997), the Presidential Lectureship at Reed College, (2002) and the Brackenridge Lectureship, University of Texas (2017). He was the Carl Gustav Hempel Lecturer at Princeton University (2006), the Gareth Evans Memorial Lecturer at Oxford University (2017), the Gifford Lecturer at the University of St Andrews (2019), the Townsend Lecturer at U.C. Berkeley (2019) and the Stanton Lecturer at the University of Cambridge (2023). In January 2024, he will deliver the Romanell lecture at the Eastern Division of the American Philosophical Association in New York City.

Johnston’s awards include the Governors Prize in the Humanities, the Pew Charitable Trust Award, the American Academy of Religion Award for Excellence, the Prose Award for Scholarly Excellence from the American Scholarly Editors, the Marc Sanders Award, the Behrman Award for Distinguished Achievement in the Humanities, and the American Philosophical Association’s Romanell Prize. The literary critic James Wood in New Yorker Magazine named Johnston’s book Saving God as a top non-fiction book of 2009. The Boston Review listed his “Is Life a Ponzi Scheme?” a favorite essay of 2014.

== Contributions ==
Though he first published in formal logic, working on a general solution to the reflexive paradoxes, over his career Johnston has gone on to make influential contributions in a wide range of fields including ontology, cognitive science, philosophy of mind, epistemology, religion, value theory and the ethics of investing.

Johnston is known for (i) deflating the significance of the method of cases for philosophy, pointing to just how the empirical psychological theory of concepts undermines conceptual analysis as an interesting way for philosophy to proceed, (ii) emphasizing the authority of affect, (iii) explaining the straightforward coherence of wishful thinking and self-deception, (iv) offering the idea of response-independence as a measure of the objectivity of a discourse, (v) proposing an account of object perception as the presentation of external objects in a sensory-motor field, prior to the entertaining of truth evaluable perceptual contents, (vi) introducing the original, pre-Lewisian distinction between perduring and enduring, developing a distinctive partial endurance account of identity over time for those persisting material things that are not "ontological trash," (viii) examining the prospects of relativism about the self, (ix) providing a straightforward account of constitution as the relation between a thing and its dependent parts, (x) developing a general account of hylomorphism in terms of Nelson Goodman’s idea of relations that generate, arguing that Nelson Goodman and Harry S. Leonard’s widely accepted mereology does not provide the general theory of the part-whole relation, but only characterizes the simplest and most trivial wholes, the mereological sums, (xi) developing both the so-called “personite” and other fellow-traveler worries problems for reductive accounts of personal survival, and the remnant person problem for the view that we are essentially animals.

In a recent work—On the Basis of Morality: Will in a World of Species-Relative Value—Johnston has addressed the question of the ground of moral status, claiming that to be able to be morally wronged one need not be a full moral agent, but merely a conscious valuer of value, i.e., a will capable of acting to secure species-relative values presented by way of valenced modes of conscious presentation. In that sense he takes us to be on a par with many of the other animals. Herein, he suggests, also lies the hint to the solution of the personite problem and its troubling “animalite” variant. Johnston maintains that we, and the other animals that are moral subjects capable of being wronged, are embodied wills. Wills endure, while their embodiments are ontologically trashy perdurers. Reductionists about personal identity over time, such as Derek Parfit in Reasons and Persons miss the very enduring thing, an individual will, that makes ethical life workable, Johnston argues.

Johnston’s books Saving God (Princeton University Press 2009) and Surviving Death (Princeton University Press 2010) surprised his fellow philosophers, since until they appeared Johnston had been known as the “philosopher’s philosopher” someone pursuing intricate philosophical issues without regard for their public impact—as his then colleague Anthony Appiah put it, when introducing the second of Johnston’s Hempel Lectures (2006). Of Saving God, Jeffrey Stout wrote "This book is a brilliantly conceived contribution to natural theology. Taken together with Johnston's forthcoming Surviving Death, it constitutes the most interesting and provocative elaboration of religious naturalism since Santayana". Writing in The Australian Review of Books C.A.J. Coady remarked “Saving God: Religion after Idolatry is an astonishing book. Its surprise consists in its topic, style, passion, range of religious and philosophical scholarship, and its daring blend of human depth and philosophical originality.” Of Surviving Death, Jacques Berlinerblau, writing in the Chronicle of Higher Education remarked “Johnston reveals himself to be an engaging wit, a swaggering polymath…and, above all, a major talent.” Michael Forster observed "This outstanding book presents original and indeed brave views on a broad range of issues that are of compelling significance not only to philosophers but also to thinking people more generally. The argument proceeds with great subtlety and sophistication and shows a masterful grasp of philosophy, religion, and the arts. The book is also superbly written—pellucid, stylish, engaging, and at points richly humorous. A tour de force."

In his 2023 Stanton Lectures, Johnston offered a novel solution to the old problem of why an omniscient, omnipotent, and omnibenevolent God does not prevent horrendous evil. Johnston’s answer is that when we closely examine the ground of God’s creative act, we can see that although God remains omnipotent after creation, i.e., able to do anything metaphysically possible, the range of what is metaphysically possible narrows because of the internal requirements imposed on creation by God’s distinctive reason for creating. Johnston explains how metaphysical possibility narrows in such a way that God, though still omnipotent, can’t intervene in the wind and the waves of matter.

== Professional activities ==
In 1991, Johnston was—along with Amy Gutman, Jeffrey Stout, George Kateb and John Cooper— a founding member of the Laurance S. Rockefeller University Center for Human Values. He chaired the Princeton Philosophy Department from 1999-2005, a period during which it continued to be regarded as the leading department of philosophy in the United States and elsewhere. In 2001 Johnston received Princeton University’s Medal of Service for his work on the Presidential Search Committee that lead to the appointment of the first woman President of Princeton, Shirley Tilman. While chair of philosophy he helped Princeton hire into senior positions the distinguished American philosophers Delia Graff Fara, Anthony Appiah, Daniel Garber and three renowned Australia-based philosophers—Peter Singer, Michael Smith and Philip Pettit. In 2012, as Senior Academic Advisor of the Marc Sanders Foundation, he personally established almost all of the Foundation’s projects, which were designed to favor the disadvantaged and the young in the profession, and which continue to this day. In 2013, with Yena Lee, he worked on the early formation and financial support of the now internationally known Minorities in Philosophy (MAP).

From 2018-2020 Johnston served as the Director of Princeton University’s Program in Cognitive Science.

== Selected articles ==
- "Human Beings," Journal of Philosophy 84 (1987): 59–83.
- "Dispositional Theories of Value," Proceedings of the Aristotelian Society 63 (1989): 89-174 (with David K. Lewis and Michael A. Smith)
- "Reasons and Reductionism," Philosophical Review (1992): 589–618.
- "Constitution is Not Identity," Mind 101 (1992): 89–106.
- "Manifest Kinds," Journal of Philosophy 94 (1997): 564–583.
- "The Obscure Object of Hallucination," Philosophical Studies 120 (2004): 113–83.
- "Hylomorphism," Journal of Philosophy 103 (2006): 652–698.
