= Institute for Liberal Studies =

Institute For Liberal studies
- Formation: 2006
- Headquarters: Ottawa
- Executive Director: Matt Bufton
- Website: theils.ca

The Institute for Liberal Studies (ILS) is a registered educational charity located in Ottawa, Canada that focuses on the discussion of classical liberal ideas, particularly democracy, rule of law, and economic and personal freedoms. Attendees of ILS events hear from leading scholars and policy experts, and its seminars explore various themes and topics such as the relationship between economics and government, philosophy and society, environmental policy, and social policy.
