= Reasons and Persons =

1984 book by Derek Parfit

- Author: Derek Parfit
- Language: English
- Subjects: Ethics, rationality, personal identity
- Publisher: Oxford University Press
- Publication date: 1984
- Publication place: United Kingdom
- Media type: Print
- Pages: 560 (Hardcover and Paperback)
- ISBN: 0-19-824908-X
- OCLC: 9827659

Reasons and Persons is a 1984 book by the philosopher Derek Parfit, in which he discusses ethics, rationality and personal identity. It is divided into four parts, dedicated to self-defeating theories, rationality and time, personal identity and responsibility toward future generations.

== Summary ==
=== Self-defeating theories ===
Part 1 argues that certain ethical theories are self-defeating. One such theory is ethical egoism, which Parfit claims is 'collectively self-defeating' due to the prisoner's dilemma, though he does not believe this is sufficient grounds to reject the theory. Ultimately, Parfit does reject "common sense morality" on similar grounds.

In this section, Parfit does not explicitly endorse a particular view; rather, he shows what the problems of different theories are. His only positive endorsement is of "impersonal ethics" – impersonality being the common denominator of the different parts of the book.

=== Rationality and time ===
Part 2 focuses on the relationship between rationality and time, dealing with questions such as: should we take into account our past desires?, should I do something I will regret later, even if it seems a good idea now?, and so on.

Parfit's main purpose in Part 2 is to make an argument against self-interest theory. Self-interest theorists consider the differences between different persons to be extremely important, but do not consider the differences between the same person at different times to be important at all. Parfit argues that this makes self-interest theory vulnerable to attack from two directions. It can be compared to morality on one side, and 'present-aim theory' on the other. Parfit argues that our present aims can sometimes conflict with our long term self-interest. Arguments that a self-interest theorist uses to explain why it is irrational to act on such aims, can be turned against the self-interest theorist, and used as arguments in favor of morality. Conversely, arguments that a self-interest theorist uses against morality could also be used as arguments in support of 'present-aim' theory.

=== Personal identity ===
Part 3 argues for a reductive account of personal identity; rather than accepting the claim that our existence is a deep, significant fact about the world, Parfit's account of personal identity is like this:

At time 1, there is a person. At a later time 2, there is a person. These people seem to be the same person. Indeed, these people share memories and personality traits. But there are no further facts in the world that make them the same person.

Parfit's argument for this position relies on our intuitions regarding thought experiments such as teleportation, the fission and fusion of persons, gradual replacement of the matter in one's brain, gradual alteration of one's psychology, and so on. For example, Parfit asks the reader to imagine entering a "teletransporter", a machine that puts you to sleep, then destroys you, breaking you down into atoms, copying the information and relaying it to Mars at the speed of light. On Mars, another machine re-creates you (from local stores of carbon, hydrogen, and so on), each atom in exactly the same relative position. Parfit poses the question of whether the teletransporter is a method of travel—is the person on Mars the same person as the one who entered the teletransporter on Earth? Certainly, the person who awakens on Mars would feel they were you, would remember entering the teletransporter to travel to Mars, and would even feel the cut on their upper lip from shaving this morning.

Then the teleporter is upgraded. The teletransporter on Earth is modified to not destroy the person who enters it. Instead it can make infinite replicas, all of whom would claim to remember entering the teletransporter on Earth.

Using thought experiments such as these, Parfit argues that any criteria we attempt to use to determine sameness of person will be lacking, because there is no further fact. What matters, to Parfit, is simply "Relation R", psychological connectedness, including memory, personality, and so on.

Parfit follows this logic to establish a new context for morality and social control. He cites that it is morally wrong for one person to harm or interfere with another person and it is incumbent on society to protect individuals from such transgressions. That accepted, it is a short extrapolation to conclude that it is also incumbent on society to protect an individual's "Future Self" from such transgressions; tobacco use could be classified as an abuse of a Future Self's right to a healthy existence. Parfit follows the logic to reach this conclusion, which appears to justify incursion into personal freedoms, but does not explicitly endorse such invasive control.

Parfit's conclusion is similar to David Hume's bundle theory, and also to the view of the self in Buddhism's Skandha, though it does not restrict itself to a mere reformulation of them. For besides being reductive, Parfit's view is also deflationary: in the end, "what matters" is not personal identity, but rather mental continuity and connectedness.

=== Future generations ===
Part 4 deals with questions of our responsibility towards future generations, also known as population ethics. It raises questions about whether it can be wrong to create a life, whether environmental destruction violates the rights of future people, and so on.

One question Parfit raises is this: given that the course of history drastically affects what people are actually born (since it affects which potential parents actually meet and have children; and also, a difference in the time of conception will alter the genetic makeup of the child), do future persons have a right to complain about our actions, since they likely wouldn't exist if things had been different? This is called the non-identity problem.

Another problem Parfit looks at is the mere addition paradox, which supposedly shows that it is better to have a lot of people who are slightly happy, than a few people who are very happy. Parfit calls this view "repugnant", but says he has not yet found a solution.

== Reception ==
Bernard Williams called Reasons and Persons "brilliantly clever and imaginative" and commended it as part of a wave of work in analytic philosophy that deals with concrete moral problems rather than abstract meta-ethics.

Philip Kitcher wrote in his review of Parfit's On What Matters that Reasons and Persons "was widely viewed as an outstanding contribution to a cluster of questions in metaphysics and ethics".

Peter Singer included Reasons and Persons on a top ten list of favourite books in The Guardian, writing, "Parfit's penetrating thought and spare prose make this one of the most exciting, if challenging, works by a contemporary philosopher".

For The New York Review of Books, the philosopher P. F. Strawson gave the book a favourable review, writing, "Very few works in the subject can compare with Parfit's in scope, fertility, imaginative resource, and cogency of reasoning".

In an interview, David Chalmers said he "loved" Reasons and Persons and that it gave him a "sense of how powerful analytic philosophy can be when done clearly and accessibly".
