= Hilary Greaves =

British philosopher (born 1978)

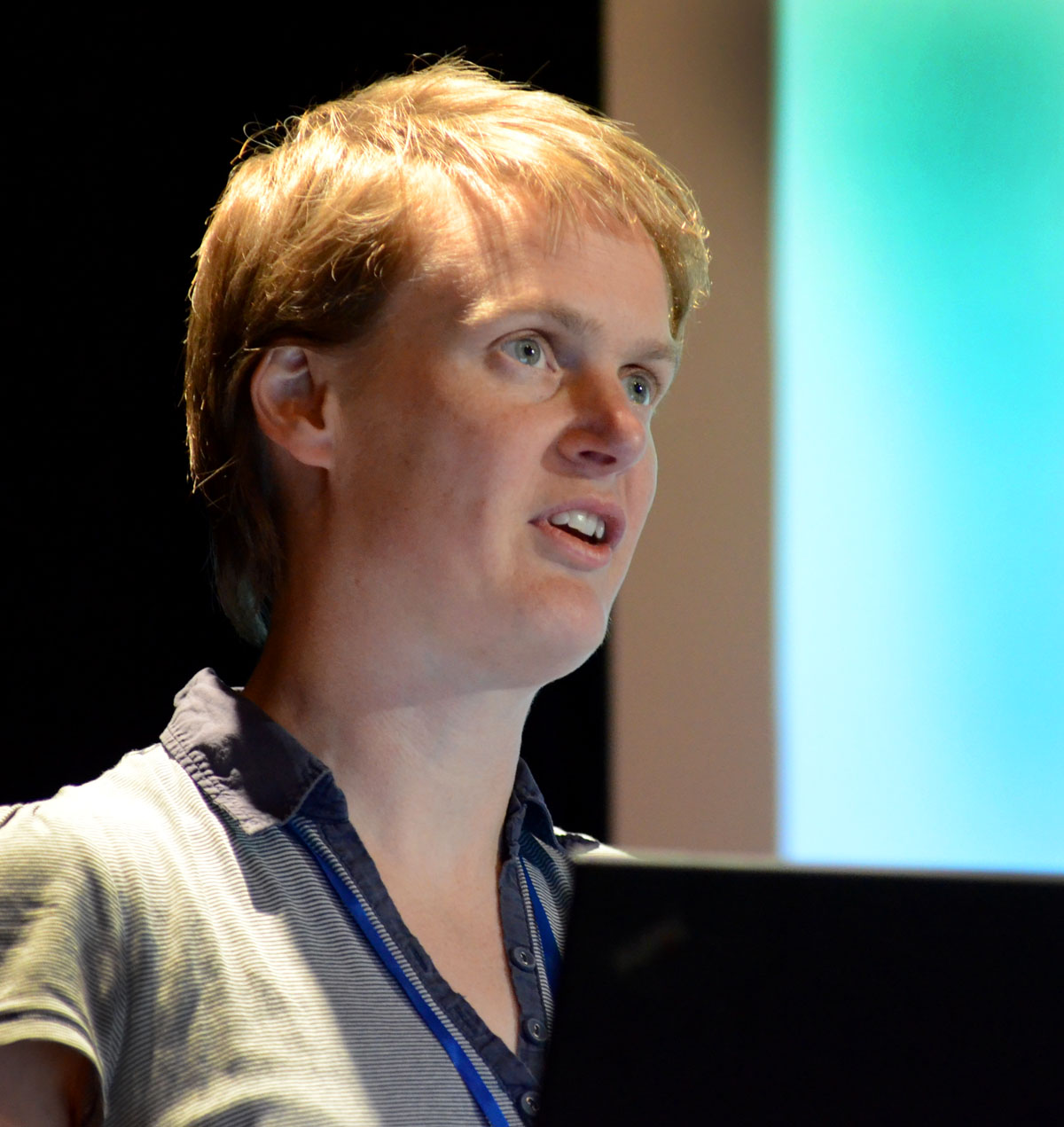
- Greaves in 2015
- Born: 1978 (age 47–48); Cardiff, Wales

Education
- Education: University of Oxford (BA, 2003); Rutgers University (PhD, 2008)
- Thesis: Spacetime Symmetries and the CPT Theorem (2008)
- Doctoral advisor: Frank Arntzenius

Philosophical work
- Era: Contemporary philosophy
- Region: Western philosophy
- Institutions: Merton College, Oxford; Somerville College, Oxford
- Main interests: Effective altruism; moral philosophy; formal epistemology
- Website: users.ox.ac.uk/~mert2255/

Hilary Greaves (born 1978) is a British philosopher, currently serving as professor of philosophy at the University of Oxford. From 2017 to 2022, she was the founding director of the Global Priorities Institute, a research centre for effective altruism at the university supported by Open Philanthropy.

== Education ==
Greaves earned a BA in philosophy and physics from the University of Oxford in 2003, and a PhD in philosophy from Rutgers University in 2008. Her doctoral thesis was titled Spacetime Symmetries and the CPT Theorem and was supervised by Frank Arntzenius. She has held appointments at Merton College and Somerville College and, since 2016, has been a professor of philosophy at Oxford.

== Research ==
Greaves studies a variety of topics across moral philosophy, including effective altruism, global prioritisation, interpersonal aggregation, formal epistemology, population ethics, and the philosophy of physics, particularly quantum mechanics.

In October 2022, she was featured in Vox's Future Perfect 50 for her work on longtermism. She has argued that, just as geographical distance should make no difference to how important it is to alleviate a person's suffering (to the extent that one is able to), temporal distance is likewise morally irrelevant. Greaves has defended her longtermist position in terms of both utilitarian outcomes and intergenerational justice.

== Selected publications ==
=== Books ===
- Greaves, Hilary, and Theron Pummer (eds). Effective Altruism: Philosophical Issues. Oxford University Press, 2019. ISBN 9780192578303
- Greaves, Hilary, Jacob Barrett, and David Thorstad (eds). Essays on Longtermism: Present Action for the Distant Future. Oxford University Press, 2025. ISBN 9780191979972

=== Peer-reviewed articles ===
- Greaves, Hilary. 2013. "Epistemic Decision Theory". Mind. 122, no. 488: 915–952.
- Greaves, Hilary, and David Wallace. 2006. "Justifying conditionalization: Conditionalization maximizes expected epistemic utility". Mind. 115, no. 459: 607–631.
- Greaves, Hilary. 2010. "Towards a Geometrical Understanding of the CPT Theorem". The British Journal for the Philosophy of Science. 61, no. 1: 27–50. (Winner of the James T. Cushing Memorial Prize in History and Philosophy of Physics.)
