= Gustaf Arrhenius =

Swedish philosopher

Gustaf Svante Henning Arrhenius (born 28 June 1966) is a Swedish philosopher.

He is a professor of practical philosophy at Stockholm University, holding a Ph.D. in philosophy from the University of Toronto and a Ph.D. in practical philosophy from Uppsala University.

Arrhenius is known for his research in moral philosophy and political philosophy, with a particular focus on issues related to future generations. His research in population ethics has had a significant impact, especially through the impossibility theorems he has proven in the field and his introduction of the Sadistic Conclusion.

Since November 2014, Arrhenius has been the director of the Institute for Futures Studies in Stockholm. He has held multiple fellowships (Spring 2007, Fall 2008, September 2009, Fall 2011, Fall 2014) at the Swedish Collegium for Advanced Study in Uppsala, Sweden.
