= Torbjörn Tännsjö =

Swedish philosopher

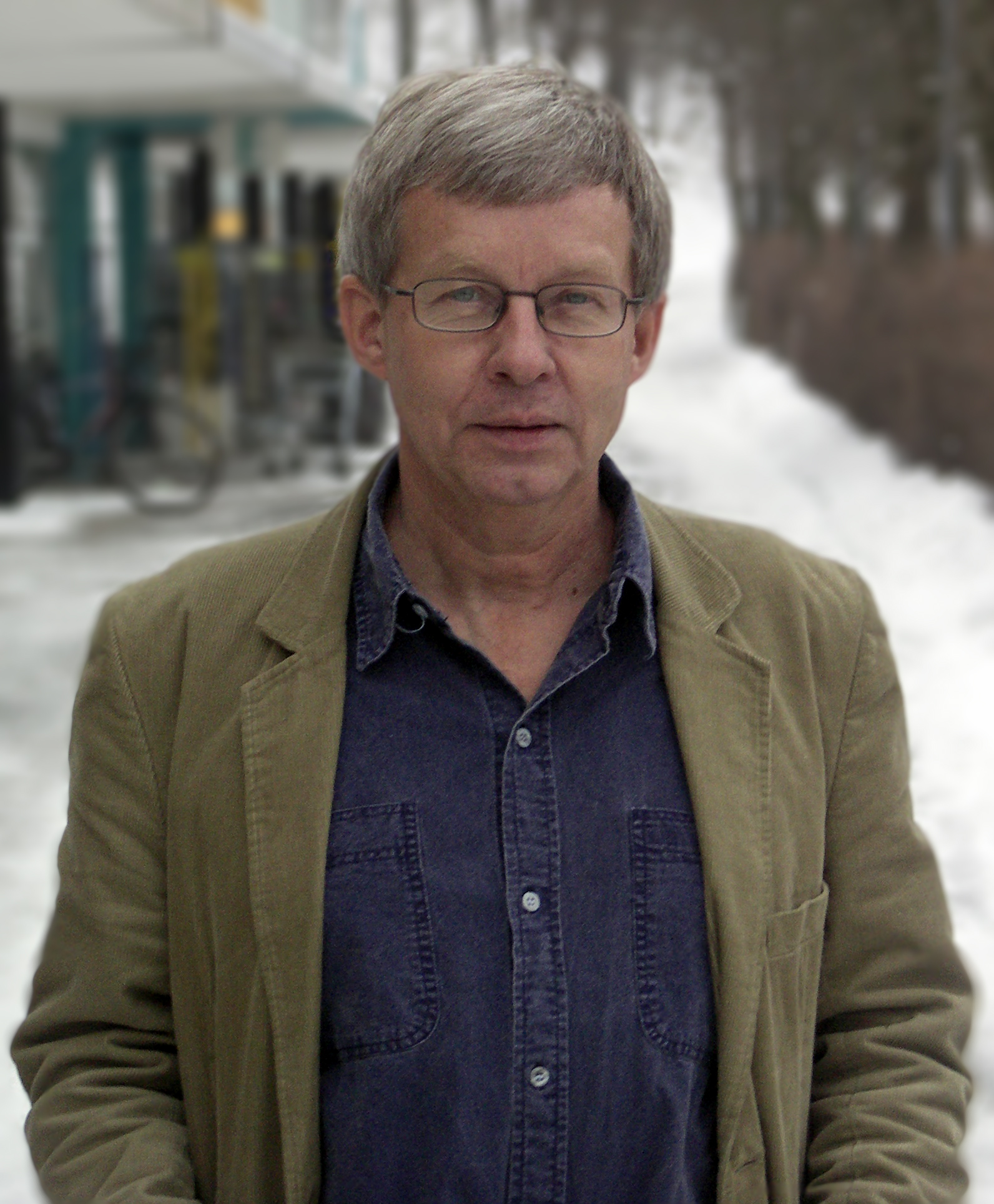
- Born: December 13, 1946 (age 79)

Philosophical work
- School: Utilitarianism
- Main interests: normative ethics, political philosophy, meta-ethics

Ulf Torbjörn Harald Tännsjö (Swedish pronunciation: [ˈtǔːrbjœɳ ˈtɛ̂nːɧøː]; born 13 December 1946 in Västerås) is a Swedish professor of philosophy and public intellectual. He has held a chair in Practical Philosophy at Stockholm University since 2002 and he is Affiliated Professor of Medical Ethics at Karolinska Institute. Tännsjö was associate professor of philosophy at Stockholm University from 1976 to 1993 and Research Fellow in Political Philosophy at the Swedish Research Council in the Humanities and Social Sciences between 1993 and 1995. Thereafter, he was a professor of Practical Philosophy at University of Gothenburg 1995–2001. He has twice been a Fellow at the Swedish Collegium for Advanced Study in Uppsala, Sweden (Fall 2008, Fall 2015).

== Career ==
Tännsjö has been a member of the medical ethics board of the faculty of medicine at University of Gothenburg and the ethical committee of Karolinska Institute. He is a member of the medical ethics committee of The National Board of Health and Welfare (the Swedish Government agency responsible for the supervision, evaluation and monitoring of social services, health care and medical services, dental care, environmental health, and control of communicable diseases). Furthermore, he is a member of the editorial board of Monash Bioethics Review, Tidskrift för politisk filosofi (Journal for Political Philosophy), Philosophical Papers, the ethics section of the web psychiatric journal Psychomedia, Bioethics and the Journal of Controversial Ideas.

Tännsjö is one of the few Swedish philosophers who is frequently heard in the public debate. His distinctly utilitarian ethical views have made him a controversial figure, notably within the medical establishment and for the Swedish Christian Democrats.

Tännsjö has been a member of the Left Party since 1970, and was involved in writing the first party programme after the party dropped the communist label in 1990.

In 2001, he debated analytic philosopher and Christian apologist William Lane Craig on the subject, "If God Is Dead, Is Everything Permitted?".

Tännsjö is a supporter of the Campaign for the Establishment of a United Nations Parliamentary Assembly, an organisation which advocates for democratic reformation of the United Nations, and the creation of a more accountable international political system.

In 2020, Tännsjö was awarded the Ethics Prize by the Swedish National Council on Medical Ethics (SMER)

Recently, Tännsjö has published, in Swedish, an intellectual autobiography in two volumes. A review of the second volume by conservative historian of ideas Svante Nordin calls Tännsjö's views on abortion, euthanasia and other issues in medical ethics “consistently crazy”. Nonetheless, Nordin praises Tännsjö's intellectual honesty and integrity, noting that he is “not primarily looking to show that [his] opponents are bad people, but rather that they are wrong. This means that he endeavors to present even the opponent's argument relatively clearly.”

== Publications ==
- Moral Realism (Savage, N.J.: Rowman and Littlefield, 1990)
- Conservatism for Our Time (London: Routledge, 1990)
- Populist Democracy: A Defence (London: Routledge, 1993)
- Hedonistic Utilitarianism (Edinburgh: Edinburgh University Press, 1998)
- Coercive Care: The Ethics of Choice in Health and Medicine (London: Routledge, 1999)
- Values in Sport: Elitism, Nationalism, Gender Equality and the Scientific Manufacture of Winners (London: E&FN Spon/Routledge, 2000)
- Terminal Sedation: Euthanasia in Disguise (Dordrecht: Kluwer, 2004).
- The Repugnant Conclusion. Essays on Population Ethics (Dordrecht. Kluwer, 2004).
- Genetic Technology and Sport (London and New York: Routledge, 2005)
- Global Democracy: The Case for a World Government (Edinburgh: Edinburgh University Press, 2008).
- Taking Life: Three Theories on the Ethics of Killing (Oxford: Oxford University Press, 2015)
- Setting Health-Care Priorities: What Ethical Theories Tell Us (Oxford: Oxford University Press, 2019
- From Despotism to Democracy. How a World Government Can Save Humanity (Springer, 2023)
- Understanding Ethics 4th revised edition (Edinburgh University Press, 2026)
