= Jan Narveson =

Canadian philosopher

Jan Narveson OC
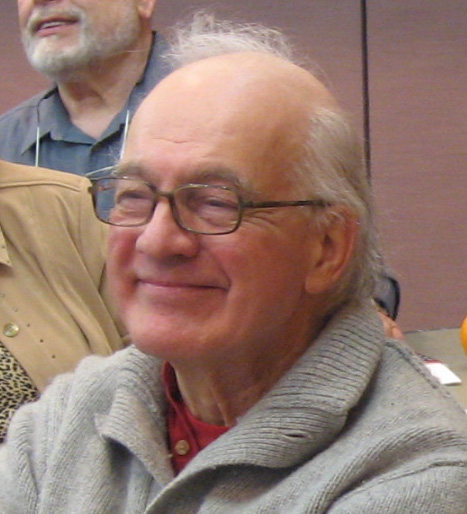
- Born: 1936 (age 89–90); Erskine, Minnesota, US

Philosophical work
- Era: Contemporary philosophy
- Region: Western philosophy
- School: Classical liberalism; libertarian anarchism; contractarianism
- Main interests: Political philosophy
- Notable ideas: Contractarian libertarianism

Jan Narveson (/ˈnɑːrvɪsən/; born 1936) is professor of philosophy emeritus at the University of Waterloo, in Waterloo, Ontario, Canada. An anarcho-capitalist and contractarian, Narveson's ideology is deeply influenced by the thought of Robert Nozick and David Gauthier.

== Biography ==
Narveson was born in Erskine, Minnesota, United States. He completed a BA (political science and philosophy) at the University of Chicago; spent a year at the University of Oxford on a traveling fellowship, and completed a PhD (1961) at Harvard University. His libertarian views have evolved from dissatisfaction with utilitarianism.

A prolific author, Narveson has written hundreds of essays, reviews and articles for publication. A critic of Marxism, he is also known at the University of Waterloo for taking part in many on-campus debates. In 2002 he published Respecting Persons in Theory and Practice (2002), a collection of his most influential essays spanning the length of his career. His most recent work is You and the State: A Short Introduction to Political Philosophy. Narveson is a long-time member of the Ontario Libertarian Party, and is currently a member of its Ethics Committee.

Apart from his libertarian work, he is the founder/president of the Kitchener-Waterloo Chamber Music Society, a long-running venue for classical chamber music.

In 2003, Narveson was made an Officer of the Order of Canada by past Governor-General of Canada, Adrienne Clarkson.

Narveson was the founding Chairman and President of the Institute for Liberal Studies, and since 2016 has been Chairman Emeritus.

== Criticism of animal rights ==
Narveson is a noted opponent of animal rights and one of Tom Regan's severe critics. He has defended a contractarian account of morality in which only agents capable of agreeing to obligations and social rules have moral standing, therefore animals cannot have rights. Under contractarian ethics all moral obligations derive from mutual agreement between different parties but as animals can not understand the terms of an agreement nor demand duties from humans then the life and welfare of the animal is only relevant as they matter to human interests.

== Selected publications ==
- Morality and Utility, Johns Hopkins University Press, 1967.
- Moral Issues, Oxford University Press, 1983.
- A Case Against Animal Rights, Moorhead State University, 1986.
- Political Correctness: For and Against co-authored with Marilyn Friedman, Rowman & Littlefield, 1995.
- Moral Matters, 2nd ed., Broadview Press, 1999.
- The Libertarian Idea, Paperback edition (with new preface). Broadview Press, 2001. (Orig. pub.: Temple University Press, 1988)
- Respecting Persons in Theory and Practice: Essays on Moral and Political Philosophy, Rowman & Littlefield, 2002.
- You and the State, 2008.
- This is Ethical Theory, Open Court, 2010.
- Are Liberty and Equality Compatible?, Cambridge University Press, 2010.

== See also ==
- List of University of Waterloo people
