= Anti-realism =

Opposite position of realism

In analytic philosophy, anti-realism is the position that the truth of a statement rests on its demonstrability through internal logic mechanisms, such as the context principle or intuitionistic logic, in direct opposition to the realist notion that the truth of a statement rests on its correspondence to an external, independent reality. In anti-realism, this external reality is hypothetical and is not assumed.

There are many varieties of anti-realism, such as metaphysical, mathematical, semantic, scientific, moral and epistemic. The term was first articulated by British philosopher Michael Dummett in an argument against a form of realism Dummett saw as 'colorless reductionism'.

Anti-realism in its most general sense can be understood as being in contrast to a generic realism, which holds that distinctive objects of a subject-matter exist and have properties independent of one's beliefs and conceptual schemes. The ways in which anti-realism rejects these types of claims can vary dramatically. Because this encompasses statements containing abstract ideal objects (i.e. mathematical objects), anti-realism may apply to a wide range of philosophical topics, from material objects to the theoretical entities of science, mathematical statements, mental states, events and processes, the past and the future.

== Varieties ==
=== Metaphysical anti-realism ===
One kind of metaphysical anti-realism maintains a skepticism about the physical world, arguing either: 1) that nothing exists outside the mind, or 2) that we would have no access to a mind-independent reality, even if it exists. The latter case often takes the form of a denial of the idea that we can have 'unconceptualised' experiences (see Myth of the Given). Conversely, most realists (specifically, indirect realists) hold that perceptions or sense data are caused by mind-independent objects. But this introduces the possibility of another kind of skepticism: since our understanding of causality is that the same effect can be produced by multiple causes, there is a lack of determinacy about what one is really perceiving, as in the brain in a vat scenario. The main alternative to this sort of metaphysical anti-realism is metaphysical realism.

On a more abstract level, model-theoretic anti-realist arguments hold that a given set of symbols in a theory can be mapped onto any number of sets of real-world objects—each set being a "model" of the theory—provided the relationship between the objects is the same (compare with symbol grounding.)

In ancient Greek philosophy, nominalist (anti-realist) doctrines about universals were proposed by the Stoics, especially Chrysippus. In early modern philosophy, conceptualist anti-realist doctrines about universals were proposed by thinkers like René Descartes, John Locke, Baruch Spinoza, Gottfried Wilhelm Leibniz, George Berkeley, and David Hume. In late modern philosophy, anti-realist doctrines about knowledge were proposed by the German idealist Georg Wilhelm Friedrich Hegel. Hegel was a proponent of what is now called inferentialism: he believed that the ground for the axioms and the foundation for the validity of the inferences are the right consequences and that the axioms do not explain the consequence. Kant and Hegel held conceptualist views about universals. In contemporary philosophy, anti-realism was revived in the form of empirio-criticism, logical positivism, semantic anti-realism and scientific instrumentalism (see below).

=== Mathematical anti-realism ===
In the philosophy of mathematics, realism is the claim that mathematical entities such as 'number' have an observer-independent existence. Empiricism, which associates numbers with concrete physical objects, and Platonism, in which numbers are abstract, non-physical entities, are the preeminent forms of mathematical realism.

The "epistemic argument" against Platonism has been made by Paul Benacerraf and Hartry Field. Platonism posits that mathematical objects are abstract entities. By general agreement, abstract entities cannot interact causally with physical entities ("the truth-values of our mathematical assertions depend on facts involving platonic entities that reside in a realm outside of space-time"). Whilst our knowledge of physical objects is based on our ability to perceive them, and therefore to causally interact with them, there is no parallel account of how mathematicians come to have knowledge of abstract objects.

Field developed his views into fictionalism. Benacerraf also developed the philosophy of mathematical structuralism, according to which there are no mathematical objects. Nonetheless, some versions of structuralism are compatible with some versions of realism.

==== Counterarguments ====
Anti-realist arguments hinge on the idea that a satisfactory, naturalistic account of thought processes can be given for mathematical reasoning. One line of defense is to maintain that this is false, so that mathematical reasoning uses some special intuition that involves contact with the Platonic realm, as in the argument given by Sir Roger Penrose.

Another line of defense is to maintain that abstract objects are relevant to mathematical reasoning in a way that is non causal, and not analogous to perception. This argument is developed by Jerrold Katz in his 2000 book Realistic Rationalism. In this book, he put forward a position called realistic rationalism, which combines metaphysical realism and rationalism.

A more radical defense is to deny the separation of physical world and the platonic world, i.e. the mathematical universe hypothesis (a variety of mathematicism). In that case, a mathematician's knowledge of mathematics is one mathematical object making contact with another.

=== Semantic anti-realism ===
The term "anti-realism" was introduced by Michael Dummett in his 1963 paper "Realism" in order to re-examine a number of classical philosophical disputes, involving such doctrines as nominalism, Platonic realism, idealism and phenomenalism. The novelty of Dummett's approach consisted in portraying these disputes as analogous to the dispute between intuitionism and Platonism in the philosophy of mathematics.

According to intuitionists (anti-realists with respect to mathematical objects), the truth of a mathematical statement consists in our ability to prove it. According to Platonic realists, the truth of a statement is proven in its correspondence to objective reality. Thus, intuitionists are ready to accept a statement of the form "P or Q" as true only if we can prove P or if we can prove Q. In particular, we cannot in general claim that "P or not P" is true (the law of excluded middle), since in some cases we may not be able to prove the statement "P" nor prove the statement "not P". Similarly, intuitionists object to the existence property for classical logic, where one can prove $\exists x.\phi(x)$, without being able to produce any term $t$ of which $\phi$ holds.

Dummett argues that this notion of truth lies at the bottom of various classical forms of anti-realism, and uses it to re-interpret phenomenalism, claiming that it need not take the form of reductionism.

Dummett's writings on anti-realism draw heavily on the later writings of Ludwig Wittgenstein, concerning meaning and rule following, and can be seen as an attempt to integrate central ideas from the Philosophical Investigations into the constructive tradition of analytic philosophy deriving from Gottlob Frege.

=== Scientific anti-realism ===
In philosophy of science, anti-realism applies chiefly to claims about the non-reality of "unobservable" entities such as electrons or genes, which are not detectable with human senses.

One prominent variety of scientific anti-realism is instrumentalism, which takes a purely agnostic view towards the existence of unobservable entities, in which the unobservable entity X serves as an instrument to aid in the success of theory Y and does not require proof for the existence or non-existence of X.

==== Anti-representationalism ====
Anti-representationalism rejects the idea that thought and language function by mirroring or representing an independent reality. Instead, it adopts a deflationary view of truth and reference, treating them as pragmatic tools within discourse rather than robust semantic relations. Anti-representationalists like Richard Rorty and Huw Price argue that all ontological commitments are framework-dependent, denying any privileged "external" perspective to judge which claims (including scientific ones) correspond to reality.

=== Moral anti-realism ===
In the philosophy of ethics, moral anti-realism (or moral irrealism) is a meta-ethical doctrine that there are no objective moral values or normative facts. It is usually defined in opposition to moral realism, which holds that there are objective moral values, such that a moral claim may be either true or false. Specifically the moral anti-realist is committed to denying at least one of the following three statements:

1. The Semantic Thesis: Moral statements have meaning, they express propositions, or are the kind of things that can be true or false.
2. The Alethic Thesis: Some moral propositions are true.
3. The Metaphysical Thesis: The metaphysical status of moral facts is robust and ordinary, not importantly different from other facts about the world.

Different versions of moral anti-realism deny different statements: specifically, non-cognitivism denies the first claim, arguing that moral statements have no meaning or truth content, error theory denies the second claim, arguing that all moral statements are false, and ethical subjectivism denies the third claim, arguing that the truth of moral statements is mind dependent.

Examples of anti-realist moral theories might be:

- Ethical subjectivism
- Non-cognitivism
- Emotivism
- Prescriptivism
- Quasi-realism
- Projectivism
- Moral fictionalism
- Moral nihilism
- Moral skepticism

There is a debate as to whether moral relativism is actually an anti-realist position. While many versions deny the metaphysical thesis, some do not, as one could imagine a system of morality which requires you to obey the written laws in your country. Such a system would be a version of moral relativism, as different individuals would be required to follow different laws, but the moral facts are physical facts about the world, not mental facts, so they are metaphysically ordinary. Thus, different versions of moral relativism might be considered anti-realist or realist.

=== Epistemic anti-realism ===
Just as moral anti-realism asserts the nonexistence of normative facts, epistemic anti-realism asserts the nonexistence of facts in the domain of epistemology. Thus, the two are now sometimes grouped together as "metanormative anti-realism". Prominent defenders of epistemic anti-realism include Hartry Field, Simon Blackburn, Matthew Chrisman, and Allan Gibbard, among others.

== See also ==
- Arend Heyting
- Constructivist epistemology
- Crispin Wright
- Critical realism (philosophy of perception)
- Luitzen Egbertus Jan Brouwer
- Metaepistemology
- Münchhausen trilemma
- Neil Tennant (philosopher)
- Philosophical realism
- Quasi-realism

== Bibliography ==
- Michael Dummett (1978). Truth and Other Enigmas. Harvard University Press. ISBN 9780674910768.
  - Michael Dummett (1963), Truth. reprinted, pp. 1–24.
  - Michael Dummett (1963), Realism. reprinted, pp. 145–165.
  - Michael Dummett (1967), Platonism. reprinted, pp. 202–214.
- Lee Braver (2007). A Thing of This World: a History of Continental Anti-Realism, Northwestern University Press: 2007.
- Ian Hacking (1999). The Social Construction of What?. Harvard University Press: 2001.
- Samir Okasha (2002). Philosophy of Science: A Very Short Introduction. Oxford University Press.
