= Humeanism =

Philosophy and tradition inspired by David Hume

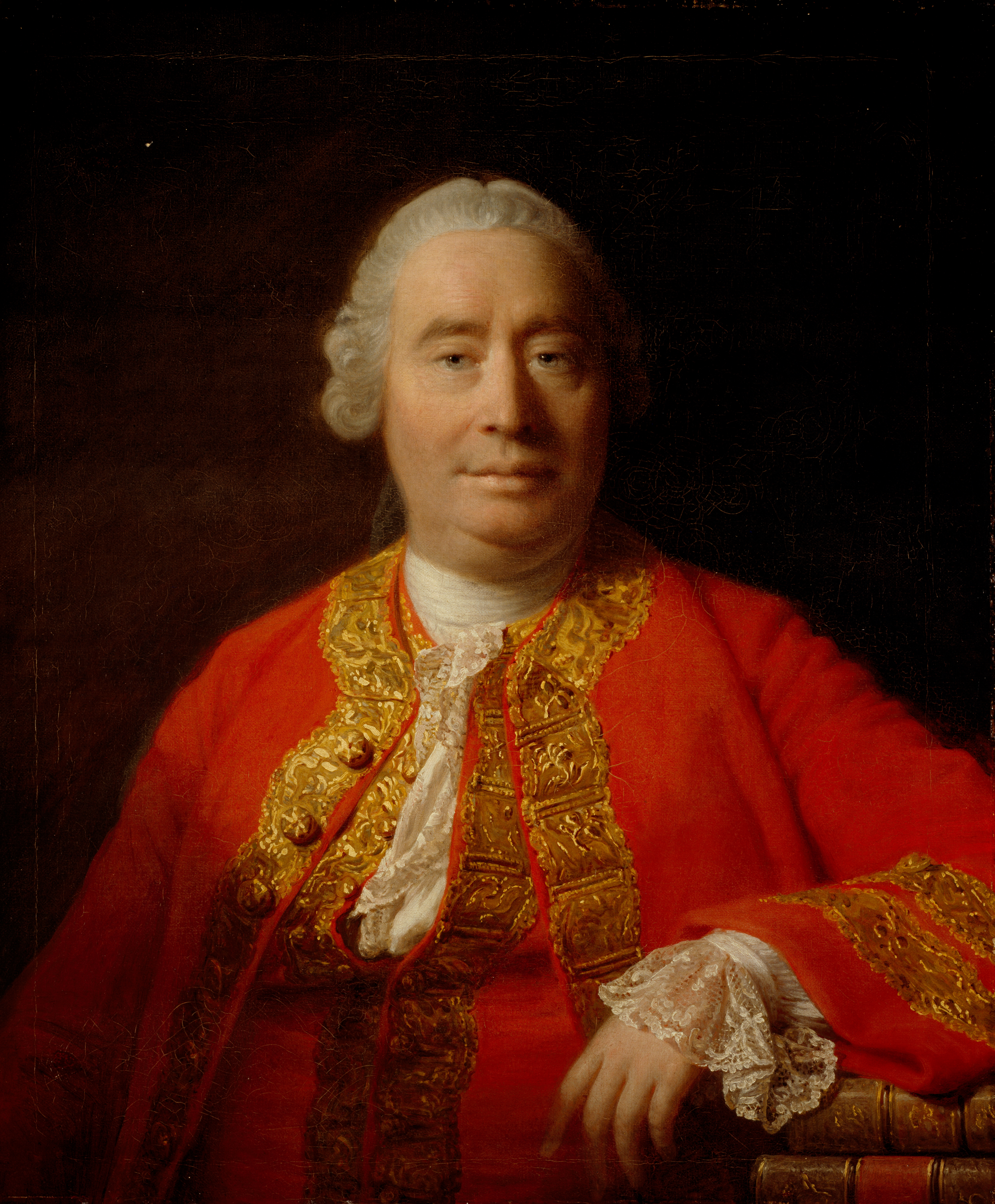
David Hume

Humeanism refers to the philosophy of David Hume and to the tradition of thought inspired by him. Hume was an influential eighteenth century Scottish philosopher well known for his empirical approach, which he applied to various fields in philosophy. In the philosophy of science, he is notable for developing the regularity theory of causation, which in its strongest form states that causation is nothing but constant conjunction of certain types of events without any underlying forces responsible for this regularity of conjunction. This is closely connected to his metaphysical thesis that there are no necessary connections between distinct entities. The Humean theory of action defines actions as bodily behavior caused by mental states and processes without the need to refer to an agent responsible for this. The slogan of Hume's theory of practical reason is that "reason is...the slave of the passions". It restricts the sphere of practical reason to instrumental rationality concerning which means to employ to achieve a given end. But it denies reason a direct role regarding which ends to follow. Central to Hume's position in metaethics is the is-ought distinction. It states that is-statements, which concern facts about the natural world, do not imply ought-statements, which are moral or evaluative claims about what should be done or what has value. In philosophy of mind, Hume is well known for his development of the bundle theory of the self. It states that the self is to be understood as a bundle of mental states and not as a substance acting as the bearer of these states, as is the traditional conception. Many of these positions were initially motivated by Hume's empirical outlook. It emphasizes the need to ground one's theories in experience and faults opposing theories for failing to do so. But many philosophers within the Humean tradition have gone beyond these methodological restrictions and have drawn various metaphysical conclusions from Hume's ideas.

== Causality and necessity ==
Causality is usually understood as a relation between two events where the earlier event is responsible for bringing about or necessitating the later event. Hume's account of causality has been influential. His first question is how to categorize causal relations. On his view, they belong either to relations of ideas or matters of fact. This distinction is referred to as Hume's fork. Relations of ideas involve necessary connections that are knowable a priori independently of experience. Matters of fact, on the other hand, concern contingent propositions about the world knowable only a posteriori through perception and memory. Causal relations fall under the category of matters of facts, according to Hume, since it is conceivable that they do not obtain, which would not be the case if they were necessary. For Hume's empiricist outlook, this means that causal relations should be studied by attending to sensory experience. The problem with this is that the causal relation itself is never given directly in perception. Through visual perception, for example, we can know that a stone was first thrown in the direction of a window and that subsequently, the window broke, but we do not directly see that the throwing caused the breaking. This leads to Hume's skeptical conclusion: that, strictly speaking, we do not know that a causal relation was involved. Instead, we just assume it based on earlier experiences that had very similar chains of events as their contents. This results in a habit of expecting the later event given the impression of the earlier one. On the metaphysical level, this conclusion has often been interpreted as the thesis that causation is nothing but constant conjunction of certain types of events. This is sometimes termed the "simple regularity theory of causation".

A closely related metaphysical thesis is known as Hume's dictum: "[t]here is no object, which implies the existence of any other if we consider these objects in themselves". Jessica Wilson provides the following contemporary formulation: "[t]here are no metaphysically necessary connections between wholly distinct, intrinsically typed, entities". Hume's intuition motivating this thesis is that while experience presents us with certain ideas of various objects, it might as well have presented us with very different ideas. So when I perceive a bird on a tree, I might as well have perceived a bird without a tree or a tree without a bird. This is so because their essences do not depend upon one another. Followers and interpreters of Hume have sometimes used Hume's dictum as the metaphysical foundation of Hume's theory of causation. On this view, there cannot be any causal relation in a robust sense since this would involve one event necessitating another event, the possibility of which is denied by Hume's dictum.

Hume's dictum has been employed in various arguments in contemporary metaphysics. It can be used, for example, as an argument against nomological necessitarianism, the view that the laws of nature are necessary, i.e. are the same in all possible worlds. To see how this might work, consider the case of salt being thrown into a cup of water and subsequently dissolving. This can be described as a series of two events, a throwing-event and a dissolving-event. Necessitarians hold that all possible worlds with the throwing-event also contain a subsequent dissolving-event. But the two events are distinct entities, so according to Hume's dictum, it is possible to have one event without the other. David Lewis follows this line of thought in formulating his principle of recombination: "anything can coexist with anything else, at least provided they occupy distinct spatiotemporal positions. Likewise, anything can fail to coexist with anything else". Combined with the assumption that reality consists on the most fundamental level of nothing but a spatio-temporal distribution of local natural properties, this thesis is known as "Humean supervenience". It states that laws of nature and causal relations merely supervene on this distribution of local natural properties. An even wider application is to use Hume's dictum as the foundational principle determining which propositions or worlds are possible and which are impossible based on the notion of recombination.

Not all interpreters agree that the reductive metaphysical outlook on causation of the Humean tradition presented in the last paragraphs actually reflects Hume's own position. Some argue against the metaphysical aspect, instead claiming that Hume's view concerning causality remained within the field of epistemology as a skeptical position on the possibility of knowing about causal relations. Others, sometimes referred to as the "New Hume tradition", reject the reductive aspect by holding that Hume was, despite his skeptical outlook, a robust realist about causation.

== Theory of action ==
Theories of action try to determine what actions are, specifically their essential features. One important feature of actions, which sets them apart from mere behavior, is that they are intentional or guided "under an idea". On this issue, Hume's analysis of action emphasizes the role of psychological faculties and states, like reasoning, sensation, memory, and passion. It is characteristic of his outlook that it manages to define action without reference to an agent. Agency arises instead from psychological states and processes like beliefs, desires and deliberation. Some actions are initiated upon concluding an explicit deliberation on which course of action to take. But for many other actions, this is not the case. Hume infers from this that "acts of the will" are not a necessary requirement for actions.

The most prominent philosopher of action in the Humean tradition is Donald Davidson. Following Hume in defining actions without reference to an agent, he holds that actions are bodily movements that are caused by intentions. The intentions themselves are explained in terms of beliefs and desires. For example, the action of flipping a light switch rests, on the one hand, on the agent's belief that this bodily movement would turn on the light and, on the other hand, on the desire to have light. According to Davidson, it is not just the bodily behavior that counts as the action but also the consequences that follow from it. So the movement of the finger flipping the switch is part of the action as well as the electrons moving through the wire and the light bulb turning on. Some consequences are included in the action even though the agent did not intend them to happen. It is sufficient that what the agent does "can be described under an aspect that makes it intentional". So, for example, if flipping the light switch alerts the burglar then alerting the burglar is part of the agent's actions.

One important objection to Davidson's and similar Humean theories focuses on the central role assigned to causation in defining action as bodily behavior caused by intention. The problem has been referred to as wayward or deviant causal chains. A causal chain is wayward if the intention caused its goal to realize but in a very unusual way that was not intended, e.g. because the skills of the agent are not exercised in the way planned. For example, a rock climber forms the intention to kill the climber below him by letting go of the rope. A wayward causal chain would be that, instead of opening the holding hand intentionally, the intention makes the first climber so nervous that the rope slips through his hand and thus leads to the other climber's death. Davidson addresses this issue by excluding cases of wayward causation from his account since they are not examples of intentional behavior in the strict sense. So bodily behavior only constitutes an action if it was caused by intentions in the right way. But this response has been criticized because of its vagueness since spelling out what "right way" means has proved rather difficult.

== Practical reason ==
The slogan of Hume's theory of practical reason is that "reason is...the slave of the passions". It expresses the idea that it is the function of practical reason to find the means for realizing pre-given ends. Important for this issue is the distinction between means and ends. Ends are based on intrinsic desires, which are about things that are wanted for their own sake or are valuable in themselves. Means, on the other hand, are based on instrumental desires which want something for the sake of something else and thereby depend on other desires. So on this view, practical reason is about how to achieve something but it does not concern itself with what should be achieved. What should be achieved is determined by the agent's intrinsic desires. This may vary a lot from person to person since different people want very different things.

In contemporary philosophy, Hume's theory of practical reason is often understood in terms of norms of rationality. On the one hand, it is the thesis that we should be motivated to employ the means necessary for the ends we have. Failing to do so would be irrational. Expressed in terms of practical reasons, it states that if an agent has a reason to realize an end, this reason is transmitted from the end to the means, i.e. the agent also has a derivative reason to employ the means. This thesis is seldom contested since it seems quite intuitive. Failing to follow this requirement is a form of error, not only when judged from an external perspective, but even from the agent's own perspective: the agent cannot plead that he does not care since he already has a desire for the corresponding end.

On the other hand, contemporary Humeanism about practical reason includes the assertion that only our desires determine which initial reasons we have. So having a desire to swim at the beach provides the agent with a reason to do so, which in turn provides him with a reason to travel to the beach. On this view, whether the agent has this desire is not a matter of being rational or not. Rationality just requires that an agent who wants to swim at the beach should be motivated to travel there. This thesis has proved most controversial. Some have argued that desires do not provide reasons at all, or only in special cases. This position is often combined with an externalist view of rationality: that reasons are given not from the agent's psychological states but from objective facts about the world, for example, from what would be objectively best. This is reflected, for example, in the view that some desires are bad or irrational and can be criticized on these grounds. On this position, psychological states like desires may be motivational reasons, which move the agent, but not normative reasons, which determine what should be done. Others allow that desires provide reasons in the relevant sense but deny that this role is played only by desires. So there may be other psychological states or processes, like evaluative beliefs or deliberation, that also determine what we should do. This can be combined with the thesis that practical reason has something to say about which ends we should follow, for example, by having an impact either on these other states or on desires directly.

A common dispute between Humeans and Anti-Humeans in the field of practical reason concerns the status of morality. Anti-Humeans often assert that everyone has a reason to be moral. But this seems to be incompatible with the Humean position, according to which reasons depend on desires and not everyone has a desire to be moral. This poses the following threat: it may lead to cases where an agent simply justifies his immoral actions by pointing out that he had no desire to be moral. One way to respond to this problem is to draw a clear distinction between rationality and morality. If rationality is concerned with what should be done according to the agent's own perspective then it may well be rational to act immorally in cases when the agent lacks moral desires. Such actions are then rationally justified but immoral nonetheless. But it is a contested issue whether there really is such a gap between rationality and morality.

== Metaethics ==
Central to Hume's position in metaethics is the is-ought distinction. It is guided by the idea that there is an important difference between is-statements, which concern facts about the natural world, and ought-statements, which are moral or evaluative claims about what should be done or what has value. The key aspect of this difference is that is-statements do not imply ought-statements. This is important, according to Hume, because this type of mistaken inference has been a frequent source of error in the history of philosophy. Based on this distinction, interpreters have often attributed various related philosophical theses to Hume in relation to contemporary debates in metaethics. One of these theses concerns the dispute between cognitivism and non-cognitivism. Cognitivists assert that ought-statements are truth-apt, i.e. are either true or false. They resemble is-statements in this sense, which is rejected by non-cognitivists. Some non-cognitivists deny that ought-statements have meaning at all, although the more common approach is to account for their meaning in other ways. Prescriptivists treat ought-statements as prescriptions or commands, which are meaningful without having a truth-value. Emotivists, on the other hand, hold that ought-statements merely express the speaker's emotional attitudes in the form of approval or disapproval. The debate between cognitivism and non-cognitivism concerns the semantic level about the meaning and truth-value of statements. It is reflected on the metaphysical level as the dispute about whether normative facts about what should be the case are part of reality, as realists claim, or not, as anti-realists contend. Based on Hume's denial that ought-statements are about facts, he is usually interpreted as an anti-realist. But interpreters of Hume have raised various doubts both for labeling him as an anti-realist and as a non-cognitivist.

== Bundle theory of the self ==
In philosophy of mind, Hume is well known for his development of the bundle theory of the self. In his analyses, he uses the terms "self", "mind" and "person" interchangeably. He denies the traditional conception, usually associated with René Descartes, that the mind is constituted by a substance or an immaterial soul that acts as the bearer of all its mental states. The key to Hume's critique of this conception comes from his empirical outlook: that such a substance is never given as part of our experience. Instead, introspection only shows a manifold of mental states, referred to by Hume as "perceptions". For Hume, this epistemic finding implies a semantic conclusion: that the words "mind" or "self" cannot mean substance of mental states but must mean bundle of perceptions. This is the case because, according to Hume, words are associated with ideas and ideas are based on impressions. So without impressions of a mental substance, we lack the corresponding idea. Hume's theory is often interpreted as involving an ontological claim about what selves actually are, which goes beyond the semantic claim about what the word "self" means. But others contend that this constitutes a misinterpretation of Hume since he restricts his claims to the epistemic and semantic level.

One problem for the bundle theory of the self is how to account for the unity of the self. This is usually understood in terms of diachronic unity, i.e. how the mind is unified with itself at different times or how it persists through time. But it can also be understood in terms of synchronic unity, i.e. how at one specific time, there is unity among the different mental states had by the same subject. A substance, unlike a simple collection, can explain either type of unity. This is why bundles are not equated with mere collections, the difference being that the bundled elements are linked to each other by a relation often referred to as "compresence", "co-personality" or "co-consciousness". Hume tried to understand this relation in terms of resemblance and causality. On this account, two perceptions belong to the same mind if they resemble each other and/or stand in the right causal relations to each other. Hume's particular version of this approach is usually rejected, but there are various other proposals on how to solve this problem compatible with the bundle theory. They include accounting for the unity in terms of psychological continuity or seeing it as a primitive aspect of the compresence-relation.

== See also ==
- Hume Society
