= Braver =

Braver is a surname. Notable people with the surname include:

- Adam Braver (born 1963), American author
- Gary Braver, pen name of Gary Goshgarian, science fiction and thriller author
- Lee Braver (born 1969), American philosopher
- Rita Braver (born 1948), correspondent for CBS News

== See also ==
- Braver (Transformers)
