= Russ Shafer-Landau =

American philosopher (born 1963)

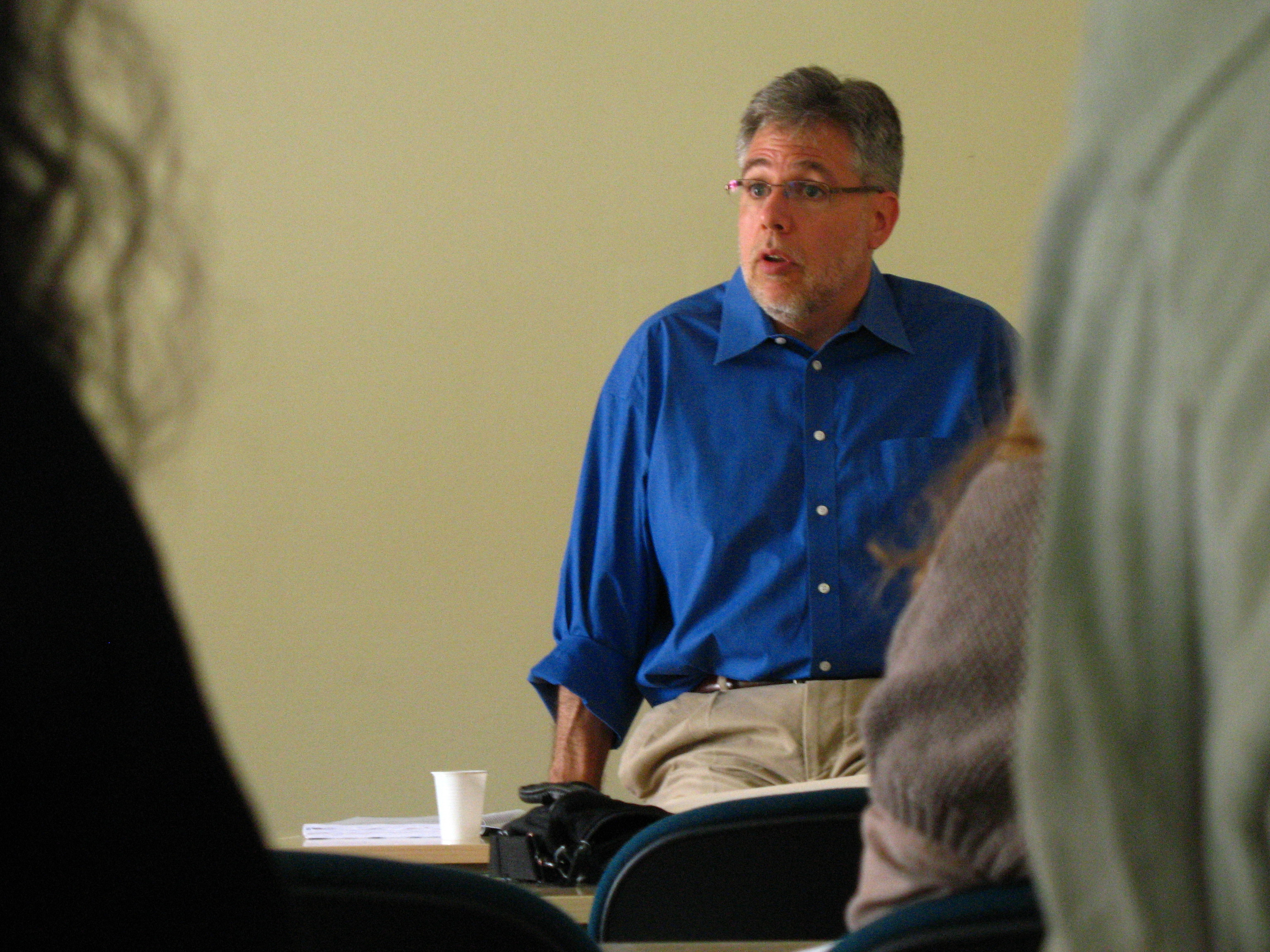
- Shafer-Landau in Tartu, Estonia in 2009
- Born: February 18, 1963 (age 63)

Education
- Education: University of Arizona (Ph.D.)
- Thesis: Moral Indeterminacy (1992)
- Doctoral advisor: Joel Feinberg

Philosophical work
- Era: 21st-century philosophy
- Region: Western philosophy
- School: Analytic
- Institutions: University of Wisconsin, Madison
- Main interests: Moral philosophy
- Website: sites.google.com/shaferlandau

Russ Shafer-Landau (born 1963) is an American philosopher and professor of philosophy at the University of Wisconsin, Madison.

== Education and career ==
Shafer-Landau is a graduate of Brown University and completed his PhD work at the University of Arizona under the supervision of Joel Feinberg. He has been teaching philosophy at the University of Wisconsin, Madison from 2002, where he became chair of the department. From 1992 to 2002 Shafer-Landau taught at the University of Kansas.

He is the founder and editor of the periodical Oxford Studies in Metaethics. Shafer-Landau returned to UW after a brief stint at the University of North Carolina, Chapel Hill, where he also served as the director of the Parr Center for Ethics. Shafer-Landau is the founder and organizer for the annual Madison Metaethics Workshop (also referred to as MadMeta, founded in 2004) which followed him to North Carolina under the name "CHillMeta," before re-assuming its original identity when Shafer-Landau returned to UW.

From 2020 to 2021, Shafer-Landau served as the Central President of the American Philosophical Association.

== Philosophical work ==
Shafer-Landau is a leading defender of a non-naturalistic moral realism, holding that moral statements are not reducible to natural terms. For example, the term 'good' cannot be described in terms of what is pleasurable and painful, nor conclusions within science. This view is established in his major work Moral Realism: A Defence, which, as one reviewer expressed it, "defends an unorthodox combination of claims, including anti-Humeanism about reasons for action, mind-independent moral realism, moral non-naturalism, moral rationalism, and reliabilist moral epistemology."

Shafer-Landau is also the author of two other introductory books, Whatever Happened To Good And Evil? and The Fundamentals of Ethics. Besides editing the annual Oxford Studies in Metaethics, he also has co-edited Reason and Responsibility: Readings in Some Basic Problems of Philosophy, an anthology covering many aspects of ethics with the late Joel Feinberg and two Blackwell anthologies, Foundations of Ethics (with Terence Cuneo), and Ethical Theory.
