= Expressivism =

Meta-ethical theory

In metaethics, expressivism is a theory about the meaning of moral language. According to expressivism, sentences that employ moral terms – for example, "It is wrong to torture an innocent human being" – are not descriptive or fact-stating; moral terms such as "wrong", "good", or "just" do not refer to real, in-the-world properties. The primary function of moral sentences, according to expressivism, is not to assert any matter of fact but rather to express an evaluative attitude toward an object of evaluation. Because the function of moral language is non-descriptive, moral sentences do not have any truth conditions. Hence, expressivists either do not allow that moral sentences have truth value, or rely on a notion of truth that does not appeal to any descriptive truth conditions being met for moral sentences.

== Overview ==
Expressivism is a form of moral anti-realism or nonfactualism: the view that there are no moral facts that moral sentences describe or represent and no moral properties or relations to which moral terms refer. Expressivists deny constructivist accounts of moral truths – e.g., Kantianism – and realist accounts – e.g., ethical intuitionism.

Because expressivism claims that the function of moral language is not descriptive, it allows the anti-realist to avoid an error theory: the view that ordinary ethical thought and discourse are committed to deep and pervasive error and that all moral statements make false ontological claims.

== Distinction from descriptivist subjectivism ==
Expressivism does not hold that moral sentences, as used in ordinary discourse, describe the speaker's moral attitudes. Expressivists are united in rejecting ethical subjectivism: the descriptivist view that utterances of the type "X is good/bad" mean "You ought to do/ought not to do X". Subjectivism is a descriptivist theory, not an expressivist one because it maintains that moral sentences are used to represent facts – namely, facts about the subject's psychological states.

== Historical development: from noncognitivism/emotivism to cognitivist expressivism ==
Some expressivist philosophers	Representative works	year
A. J. Ayer	Language, Truth, and Logic	1936
C. L. Stevenson	The Emotive Meaning of Ethical Terms	1937
R. M. Hare	The Language of Morals	1952
Wilfrid Sellars	Science and Ethics	1960
Simon Blackburn	Essays in Quasi-Realism	1993
Allan Gibbard	Wise Choices, Apt Feelings	1990
Mark Timmons	Morality without Foundations	1999
Terence Horgan (with Mark Timmons)	Cognitivist Expressivism	2006

Some early versions of expressivism arose during the early twentieth century in association with logical positivism. These early views are typically called "noncognitivist". A. J. Ayer's emotivism is a well-known example.

According to emotivism, the act of uttering a moral sentence of the type "X is good (bad)" is closely akin to the expression of a positive (or negative) emotional attitude toward X, and such an utterance can be paraphrased by "Hurrah for X!" or "Boo, X!"

C. L. Stevenson also advanced an important version of emotivism.

At the beginning of the middle of the twentieth century, R. M. Hare was an important advocate of expressivism / noncognitivism. Hare's view is called prescriptivism because he analyzed moral sentences as universal, overriding prescriptions or imperatives. A prescriptivist might paraphrase "X is good" as "Do X!".

More recent versions of expressivism, such as Simon Blackburn's "quasi-realism", Allan Gibbard's "norm-expressivism", and Mark Timmons' and Terence Horgan's "cognitivist expressivism" tend to distance themselves from the "noncognitivist" label applied to Ayer, Stevenson, and Hare. What distinguishes these "new wave" expressivists is that they resist reductive analyses of moral sentences or their corresponding psychological states, moral judgments, and they allow for moral sentences/judgments to have truth value.

Horgan and Timmons' label "cognitivist expressivism" in particular captures the philosophical commitment they share with Blackburn and Gibbard to regard moral judgments as cognitive psychological states, i.e. beliefs, and moral sentences as vehicles for genuine assertions or truth-claims. Much of the current expressivist project is occupied with defending a theory of the truth of moral sentences that is consistent with expressivism but can avoid the Frege-Geach problem (see below). Expressivists tend to rely on a minimalist or deflationary theory of truth to provide an irrealist account for the truth of moral sentences.

== Arguments for ==
=== Open question argument ===
According to the open question argument (originally articulated by intuitionist and non-naturalist G. E. Moore), for any proposed definition of a moral term, e.g. " 'good' = 'the object of desire' ", a competent speaker of English who understands the meaning of the terms involved in the statement of the definition could still hold that the question, "Is the object of desire good?" remains unanswered.

The upshot of this argument is that normative or moral terms cannot be analytically reduced to "natural" or non-moral terms. Expressivists argue that the best explanation of this irreducibility is that moral terms are not used to describe objects, but rather to evaluate them. Many philosophers regard expressivists or noncognitivists as "the real historical beneficiar[ies] of the open question argument."

=== Argument from moral disagreement ===
Persons may disagree in their moral evaluations of the same object, while possessing all the same information about the "natural" or descriptive facts about the object of evaluation. Expressivists argue that such deep moral disagreement is evidence that moral judgment is not a species of descriptive or factual judgment.

== Objections ==
=== The Frege–Geach problem ===
The Frege–Geach problem – named for Peter Geach, who developed it from the writings of Gottlob Frege – claims that by subscribing to expressivism one necessarily accepts that the meaning of "It is wrong to tell lies" is different from the meaning of the "it is wrong to tell lies" part of the conditional "If it is wrong to tell lies, then it is wrong to get your little brother to lie", and that therefore expressivism is an inadequate explanation for moral language.

Frege–Geach contends that "It is wrong to get your little brother to tell lies" can be deduced from the two premises by modus ponens as follows:

- It is wrong to tell lies.
- If it is wrong to tell lies, then it is wrong to get your little brother to tell lies.
- Therefore, it is wrong to get your little brother to tell lies.

In the second statement the expressivist account appears to fail, in that the speaker asserting the hypothetical premise is expressing no moral position towards lying, condemnatory or otherwise. The expressivist thus cannot account for the meaning of moral language in this kind of unasserted context. This problem assumes that logic only applies to real truth values.

=== Illocutionary act-intention argument ===
Terence Cuneo argues against expressivism by means of the following premise:

It is false that, in ordinary optimal conditions, when an agent performs the sentential act of sincerely uttering a moral sentence, that agent does not thereby intend to assert a moral proposition, but intends to express an attitude toward a non-moral state of affairs or object.

Some proponents of expressivism are concerned to preserve the participants in ordinary moral thought and discourse from charges of deep error. But, Cuneo argues, there is evidence that many such participants do intend to represent a factual moral reality when they make moral judgments. Hence, if the expressivists are correct and moral language is not properly used to make factual, descriptive assertions, many participants in ordinary moral discourse are frustrated in their illocutionary act intentions. On these grounds it is argued that we should give up expressivism, unless the expressivists are to give up on their claim that expressivism is not an essentially revisionist view of moral thought and discourse.

== Bibliography ==
- Ayer, A. J. (1936). Language, Truth, and Logic. London: Gollancz.
- Blackburn, Simon (1984). Spreading the Word. Oxford: Oxford University Press. ISBN 978-0-19-824650-3.
- Blackburn, Simon (1993). Essays in Quasi-Realism. Oxford: Oxford University Press.
- Blackburn, Simon (1998). Ruling Passions. Oxford: Oxford University Press.
- Cuneo, Terence (2006). "Saying what we Mean", pp. 35–71 in Russ Shafer-Landau, ed., Oxford Studies in Metaethics, vol. 1. Oxford: Oxford University Press.
- Darwall, Stephen, Gibbard, Allan, & Railton, Peter (1997). "Toward Fin de siècle Ethics: Some Trends", pp. 3–47 in Stephen Darwall, Allan Gibbard, and Peter Railton, Moral Discourse and Practice. Oxford: Oxford University Press.
- Gibbard, Allan (1990). Wise Choices, Apt Feelings. Cambridge, Mass.: Harvard University Press.
- Gibbard, Allan (2003). Thinking How to Live. Cambridge, Mass.: Harvard University Press.
- Hare, R. M. (1952). The language of morals. Oxford: Clarendon Press. OCLC 1034413.
- Horgan, Terry & Timmons, Mark (2006a). "Cognitivist Expressivism", pp. 255–298 in Terry Horgan and Mark Timmons, eds., Metaethics after Moore. Oxford: Oxford University Press.
- Horgan, Terry & Timmons, Mark (2006b). "Expressivism, Yes! Relativism, No!", pp. 73–98 in Russ Shafer-Landau, ed., Oxford Studies in Metaethics, vol. 1. Oxford: Oxford University Press.
- Horgan, Terry & Timmons, Mark (2006c). "Morality without Moral Facts", pp. 220–238 in James Dreier, ed., Contemporary Debates in Moral Theory. Oxford: Blackwell.
- Joyce, Richard, "Moral Anti-Realism", The Stanford Encyclopedia of Philosophy (Fall 2007 Edition), Edward N. Zalta (ed.).
- Ridge, Michael (2014). Impassioned Belief. Oxford: Oxford University Press.
- Schroeder, Mark (2008). Being For: Evaluating the Semantic Program of Expressivism. Oxford: Oxford University Press.
- Sellars, Wilfrid (1960/2023) "Science and Ethics" The Metaphysics of Practice: Writings on Action, Community, and Obligation (https://doi.org/10.1093/oso/9780192866820.003.0005) Pages 97–115.
- Stevenson, C. L. (1937). "The Emotive Meaning of Ethical Terms", Mind 46(181):14–31.
- Timmons, Mark (1999). Morality without Foundations. Oxford: Oxford University Press.
- van Roojen, Mark, "Moral Cognitivism vs. Non-Cognitivism", The Stanford Encyclopedia of Philosophy (Winter 2005 Edition), Edward N. Zalta (ed.).
