= Transcognition =

Transcognition is the ability to employ one's cognitive faculties to undermine values by attacking their presuppositions and using one's non-cognitive attitude to create new values. These new values are attempts by which we try to render our world estimable. This transcognitive approach was first formulated by philosopher John T. Wilcox in his study 'Truth and Value in Nietzsche' (1974). Transcognition is not to be confused with technocognition, an interdisciplinary approach to counter misinformation in a post-truth world.

== Transcognitive approach ==
In his study, Truth and Value in Nietzsche, Wilcox critically examines the issue of the relation of Friedrich Nietzsche's epistemological thinking and Nietzsche own values, in particular the extent to which, and the ways in which, Nietzsche regarded his own values as objective. This issue is called the 'problem of epistemic privilege'. To try and solve the problem, Wilcox identified a plethora of contradictions in Nietzsche's work. He divides these contradictions into two categories: the non-cognitive statements and the cognitive statements. The non-cognitive category consists of those statements which hold that values are not objective, but to be understood in terms of the beholder. This redefinition of non-cognitivism aligns with Nietzsche's perspectivism. Wilcox defines the cognitivist category as follows: those statements that can be objectively known. According to Wilcox, Nietzsche can be regarded as both a cognitivist and a non-cognitivist, in reference to the passages and quotations that were found in Nietzsche's legacy. For instance, the following passage from "Ecce Homo" seems to show Nietzsche endorsing an objective measure by which to differentiate between error and truth.

How much truth can a certain mind endure; how much truth can it dare?—these questions became for me ever more and more the actual test of values. Error (belief in the ideal) is not blindness; error is cowardice... Every conquest, every step forward in knowledge, is the outcome of courage, of hardness towards one's self, of cleanliness towards one's self. I do not refute ideals; all I do is to draw on my gloves in their presence...

Nietzsche is suggesting that our willingness to endure and dare to confront truth has become, for him, the real measure of a person's value. He is valuing those who possess the courage to confront uncomfortable truths above those who remain in blissful ignorance. In "The Will to Power" however, Nietzsche seems to be highly critical towards objective knowledge.

[...] all evaluation is made from a definite [particular] perspective: that of the preservation of the individual, a community, a race, a state, a church, a faith, a culture.— Because we forget that valuation is always from a perspective, a single individual contains within him a vast confusion of contradictory valuations and consequently of contradictory drives.

As to how a unification between the cognitive and non-cognitive category could be established, Wilcox remains inconclusive. He explains: "Nietzsche had the rudiments of several solutions, but nothing definitive." A redefinition of cognitivism by means of 'truth-value gaps' may hold the key to further solving the problem of epistemic privilege.

== Popper's logical asymmetry ==
A parallel can be drawn between transcognition and Karl Popper's argument for logical asymmetry. According to Karl Popper, falsification and verification are logically asymmetrical, which means that statements can be conclusively falsifiable, but they cannot be conclusively verifiable. Popper asserts that in order to conclusively prove a statement's falsifiability, counterevidence must not refute the statement, it must only contradict it. For a statement's verifiability, this rule does not apply. Counterarguments, which are akin to undermining values, may enjoy a similar privilege or similar kind of asymmetry, in contrast to newly created values.

== See also ==
- Error theory
- Metacognition
- Projectivism
- Fallibilism
- Fictionalism
