= Non-cognitivism =

Meta-ethical theory

Non-cognitivism is the meta-ethical view that ethical sentences do not express propositions and thus cannot be true or false. A noncognitivist denies the cognitivist claim that "moral judgments are capable of being objectively true, because they describe some feature of the world." Thus, non-cognitivism implies that moral knowledge is impossible.

Non-cognitivism entails that non-cognitive attitudes underlie moral discourse and this discourse therefore consists of non-declarative speech acts, although accepting that its surface features may consistently and efficiently work as if moral discourse were cognitive. The point of interpreting moral claims as non-declarative speech acts is to explain what moral claims mean if they are neither true nor false (as philosophies such as logical positivism entail). Utterances like "Boo to killing!" and "Don't kill" are not candidates for truth or falsity, but have non-cognitive meaning.

== Varieties ==
Emotivism, associated with A. J. Ayer, the Vienna Circle and C. L. Stevenson, though first defended by Axel Hägerström in the early 1900s, suggests that ethical sentences are primarily emotional expressions of one's own attitudes and are intended to influence the actions of the listener. Under this view, "Killing is wrong" is translated as "Killing, boo!" or "I disapprove of killing."

A close cousin of emotivism, developed by R. M. Hare, is called universal prescriptivism. Prescriptivists interpret ethical statements as being universal imperatives, prescribing behavior for all to follow. According to prescriptivism, phrases like "Thou shalt not murder!" or "Do not steal!" are the clearest expressions of morality, while reformulations like "Killing is wrong" tend to obscure the meaning of moral sentences.

Other forms of non-cognitivism include Simon Blackburn's quasi-realism and Allan Gibbard's norm-expressivism.

== Arguments in favour ==
As with other anti-realist meta-ethical theories, non-cognitivism is largely supported by the argument from queerness: ethical properties, if they existed, would be different from any other thing in the universe, since they have no observable effect on the world. People generally have a negative attitude towards murder, which presumably keeps most of us from murdering. But does the actual wrongness of murder play an independent role? Is there any evidence that there is a property of wrongness that some types of acts have? Some people might think that the strong feelings we have when we see or consider a murder provide evidence of murder's wrongness. But it is not difficult to explain these feelings without saying that wrongness was their cause. Thus there is no way of discerning which, if any, ethical properties exist; by Occam's razor, the simplest assumption is that none do. The non-cognitivist then asserts that, since a proposition about an ethical property would have no referent, ethical statements must be something else.

=== Universal prescriptivism ===
Arguments for prescriptivism focus on the function of normative statements.

Prescriptivists argue that factual statements and prescriptions are totally different, because of different expectations of change in cases of a clash between word and world. In a descriptive sentence, if one premises that "red is a number" then according to the rules of English grammar said statement would be false. Since said premise describes the objects "red" and "number", anyone with an adequate understanding of English would notice the falseness of such description and the falseness of said statement. However, if the norm "thou shalt not kill!" is uttered, and this premise is negated (by the fact of a person being murdered), the speaker is not to change his sentence upon observation of this into "kill other people!", but is to reiterate the moral outrage of the act of killing. Adjusting statements based upon objective reality and adjusting reality based upon statements are contrary uses of language; that is to say, descriptive statements are a different kind of sentence to normative statements. If truth is understood according to correspondence theory, the question of the truth or falsity of sentences not contingent upon external phenomena cannot be tested (see tautologies).

Some cognitivists argue that some expressions like "courageous" have both a factual as well as a normative component which cannot be distinguished by analysis. Prescriptivists argue that according to context, either the factual or the normative component of the meaning is dominant. The sentence "Hero A behaved courageously" is wrong, if A ran away in the face of danger. But the sentence "Be brave and fight for the glory of your country!" has no truth value and cannot be falsified by someone who does not join the army.

Prescriptivism is also supported by the actual way of speaking. Many moral statements are de facto uttered as recommendations or commands, e.g. when parents or teachers forbid children to do wrong actions. The most famous moral ideas are prescriptions: the Ten Commandments, the command of charity, the categorical imperative, and the Golden Rule command to do or not to do something rather than state that something is or is not the case.

Prescriptivism can fit the theist idea of morality as obedience towards god. It is however different from the cognitivist supernaturalism which interprets morality as subjective will of god, while prescriptivism claims that moral rules are universal and can be found by reason alone without reference to a god.

According to Hare, prescriptivists cannot argue that amoralists are logically wrong or contradictory. Everyone can choose to follow moral commands or not. This is the human condition according to the Christian reinterpretation of the Choice of Heracles. According to prescriptivism, morality is not about knowledge (of moral facts), but about character (to choose to do the right thing). Actors cannot externalize their responsibility and freedom of will towards some moral truth in the world, virtuous people do not need to wait for some cognition to choose what's right.

Prescriptivism is also supported by imperative logic, in which there are no truth values for imperatives, and by the idea of the naturalistic fallacy: even if someone could prove the existence of an ethical property and express it in a factual statement, he could never derive any command from this statement, so the search for ethical properties is pointless.

=== Emotivism ===
Arguments for emotivism focus on what normative statements express when uttered by a speaker. A person who says that killing is wrong certainly expresses her disapproval of killing. Emotivists claim that this is all she does, that the statement "killing is wrong" is not a truth-apt declaration, and that the burden of evidence is on the cognitivists who want to show that in addition to expressing disapproval, the claim "killing is wrong" is also true. Emotivists ask whether there really is evidence that killing is wrong. We have evidence that Jupiter has a magnetic field and that birds are oviparous, but as yet, we do not seem to have found evidence of moral properties, such as "goodness". Emotivists ask why, without such evidence, we should think there is such a property. Ethical intuitionists think the evidence comes not from science or reason but from our own feelings: good deeds make us feel a certain way and bad deeds make us feel very differently. But is this enough to show that there are genuinely good and bad deeds? Emotivists think not, claiming that we do not need to postulate the existence of moral "badness" or "wrongness" to explain why considering certain deeds makes us feel disapproval; that all we really observe when we introspect are feelings of disapproval. Thus the emotivist asks why not adopt the simple explanation and say that this is all there is, rather than insist that some intrinsic "badness" (of murder, for example) must be causing feelings when a simpler explanation is available.

== Arguments against ==
One argument against non-cognitivism is that it ignores the external causes of emotional and prescriptive reactions. If someone says, "John is a good person," something about John must have inspired that reaction. If John gives to the poor, takes care of his sick grandmother, and is friendly to others, and these are what inspire the speaker to think well of him, it is plausible to say, "John is a good person because he gives to the poor, takes care of his sick grandmother, and is friendly to others". If, in turn, the speaker responds positively to the idea of giving to the poor, then some aspect of that idea must have inspired a positive response; one could argue that that aspect is also the basis of its goodness.

Another argument is the "embedding problem" in which ethical sentences are embedded into more complex sentences. Consider the following examples:

- Eating meat is not wrong.
- Is eating meat wrong?
- I think that eating meat is wrong.
- Mike doesn't think that eating meat is wrong.
- I once thought that eating meat was wrong.
- She does not realize that eating meat is wrong.

Attempts to translate these sentences in an emotivist framework seem to fail (e.g. "She does not realize 'Boo to eating meat!'"). Prescriptivist translations fare only slightly better ("She does not realize that she is not to eat meat"). Even the act of forming such a construction indicates some sort of cognition in the process.

According to some non-cognitivist points of view, these sentences simply assume the false premise that ethical statements are either true or false. They might be literally translated as:

- "Eating meat is wrong" is a false statement.
- Is "eating meat is wrong" a true statement?
- I think that "eating meat is wrong" is a true statement.
- Mike doesn't think that "eating meat is wrong" is a true statement.
- I once thought that "eating meat is wrong" was a true statement.
- She does not realize that "eating meat is wrong" is a true statement.

These translations, however, seem divorced from the way people actually use language. A non-cognitivist would have to disagree with someone saying, "'Eating meat is wrong' is a false statement" (since "Eating meat is wrong" is not truth-apt at all), but may be tempted to agree with a person saying, "Eating meat is not wrong."

One might more constructively interpret these statements to describe the underlying emotional statement that they express, i.e.: I disapprove/do not disapprove of eating meat, I used to, he doesn't, I do and she doesn't, etc.; however, this interpretation is closer to ethical subjectivism than to non-cognitivism proper.

A similar argument against non-cognitivism is that of ethical argument. A common argument might be, "If killing an innocent human is always wrong, and all fetuses are innocent humans, then killing a fetus is always wrong." Most people would consider such an utterance to represent an analytic proposition which is true a priori. However, if ethical statements do not represent cognitions, it seems odd to use them as premises in an argument, and even odder to assume they follow the same rules of syllogism as true propositions. However, R.M. Hare, proponent of universal prescriptivism, has argued that the rules of logic are independent of grammatical mood, and thus the same logical relations may hold between imperatives as hold between indicatives.

Many objections to non-cognitivism based on the linguistic characteristics of what purport to be moral judgments were originally raised by Peter Glassen in "The Cognitivity of Moral Judgments", published in Mind in January 1959, and in Glassen's follow-up article in the January 1963 issue of the same journal.

== See also ==
- Amoralism
- Expressivism
- Theological noncognitivism
- Moral realism
- Moral skepticism
- Rudolf Carnap
- Richard Rorty
- Transcognition
- Simon Blackburn
- Allan Gibbard
