= Quasi-realism =

Meta-ethical theory

Quasi-realism is the meta-ethical view which claims that:

1. Ethical sentences do not express propositions.
2. Instead, ethical sentences project emotional attitudes as though they represented real properties.

This makes quasi-realism a form of non-cognitivism or expressivism. Quasi-realism stands in opposition to other forms of non-cognitivism (such as emotivism and universal prescriptivism), as well as to all forms of cognitivism (including both moral realism and ethical subjectivism).

== Overview ==
Simon Blackburn derived quasi-realism from a Humean account of the origin of our moral opinions, adapting Hume's genealogical account in the light of evolutionary game theory. To support his case, Blackburn has issued a challenge, Blackburn's Challenge, to anyone who can explain how two situations can demand different ethical responses without referring to a difference in the situations themselves. Because this challenge is effectively unmeetable, Blackburn argues that there must be a realist component in our notions of ethics.

However, argues Blackburn, ethics cannot be entirely realist either, for this would not allow for phenomena such as the gradual development of ethical positions over time. In his 1998 book, Ruling Passions, Blackburn likens ethics to Neurath's boat, which can be changed plank by plank over time, but cannot be refitted all at once for risk of sinking. Similarly, Blackburn's theory can explain the existence of rival ethical theories, for example as a result of differing cultural traditions - his theory allows both to be legitimate, despite their mutual contradictions, without dismissing both views through relativism. Thus, Blackburn's theory of quasi-realism provides a coherent account of ethical pluralism. It also answers John Mackie's concerns, presented in his argument from queerness, about the apparently contradictory nature of ethics.

Quasi-realism, a meta-ethical approach, enables ethics based on actions, virtues and consequences to be reconciled. Attempts have been made to derive from it a comprehensive theory of ethics, such as Iain King's quasi-utilitarianism in his book How to Make Good Decisions and Be Right All the Time (2008).

== Criticisms ==
Despite gaining some of the better qualities of the component theories from which it is derived, quasi-realism also picks up vulnerabilities from these different components. Thus, it is criticised in some of the ways that moral realism is criticised, for example by Fictionalism (see below); it is also attacked along with expressivism and other non-cognitive theories (indeed it has been regarded by some as a sub-category of expressivism).

=== Fictionalism ===
It has been claimed that Blackburn's programme is fictionalist, which he himself disputes. However, there are certainly continuities between both approaches. Blackburn argues that moral fictionalism is tantamount to us claiming to hold attitudes that we do not really have; that we are in some way insincere. In support of his argument, Blackburn invokes Locke's theory of colour, which defines colours as dispositional (that is, in the eye of the beholder) but in some way reliant upon facts about the world. Blackburn buttresses these arguments by further examples of quasi-realism in our understanding of the world beyond ethics.

This means that, though the moral fictionalist is in some ways having cake and eating it, the quasi-realist has a seemingly even more difficult position to defend. They may feel secure in disagreeing with Bentham that talk of natural rights is "nonsense upon stilts" but they would also argue that such rights could not be said to exist in a realist sense. Quasi-realism captures in some important ways the structure of our ethical experience of the world and why we can assert claims such as "It is wrong to be cruel to children" as if they were facts even though they do not share the properties of facts; namely the inference of independent truth-values.

From this position, Blackburn's "way forward" is to re-assert Hume's 'common point of view', or the ethical discourse common to mankind. Blackburn's thought is that though relativists and realists can agree that certain statements are true within a certain discourse, a quasi-realist investigates why such discourses have the structures that they do.

=== Frege–Geach problem ===
The coherence of Blackburn's quasi-realism has been challenged most notably by the Frege–Geach problem, which asserts Blackburn's position is self-contradictory. Advocates of Blackburn's view, however, would contend that quasi-realism in fact provides an antidote to the Frege–Geach problem by placing different moral claims in context. There is an important difference, claim the quasi-realists, between saying It is wrong to tell lies, and It is wrong to get your brother to tell lies. Indeed, say the quasi-realists, the Frege–Geach argument exposes the insensitivity of some moral realist discourse to the complexity of ethical statements.
