= Think: A Compelling Introduction to Philosophy =

1999 book by Simon Blackburn

- Cover of the first edition
- Author: Simon Blackburn
- Language: English
- Subject: Philosophy
- Publisher: Oxford University Press
- Publication date: 1999
- Publication place: United Kingdom
- Media type: Print (hardcover and paperback)
- Pages: 320
- ISBN: 0-19-285425-9
- OCLC: 45338378

Think: A Compelling Introduction to Philosophy is a 1999 book by the philosopher Simon Blackburn. It is intended to serve as an introduction to philosophy.

== Summary ==
In Think, Blackburn introduces major philosophical fields, such as epistemology, philosophy of the mind, free will, political philosophy, and philosophy of religion, by narrating how key figures in the history of Western philosophy including René Descartes, David Hume, Immanuel Kant, and Ludwig Wittgenstein addressing key concepts for each. Through these discussions, the book also outlines Blackburn's arguments for the value and importance of philosophy.

== Publication history ==
Think: A Compelling Introduction to Philosophy was first published by Oxford University Press in 1999. The book was published as an Oxford University Press Paperback in 2001.

== Reception ==
Think: A Compelling Introduction to Philosophy received a positive review from the philosopher Mark Sainsbury in Mind. Sainsbury described the book as well-written, but criticized Blackburn's discussion of knowledge. The writer Peter Edidin wrote in The New York Times that the book "found a sizable audience", noting that more than 30,000 hardcover copies had been sold and that "Oxford has asked Mr. Blackburn to follow up with Being Good, a guide to the philosophy of ethics". The philosopher Anthony Quinton wrote in 2005 that very short books such as Think form part of a recent new development "in the field of popularization by professionals."
