= Cognitivism (ethics) =

Meta-ethical theory

Cognitivism is the meta-ethical view that ethical sentences express propositions and can therefore be true or false (they are truth-apt), which noncognitivists deny. Cognitivism is so broad a thesis that it encompasses (among other views) moral realism (which claims that ethical sentences express propositions about mind-independent facts of the world), ethical subjectivism (which claims that ethical sentences express propositions about peoples' attitudes or opinions), and error theory (which claims that ethical sentences express propositions, but that they are all false, whatever their nature).

== Overview ==
Propositions are what meaningful declarative sentences (but not interrogative or imperative sentences) are supposed to express. Different sentences, in different languages, can express the same proposition: "snow is white" and "Schnee ist weiß" (in German) both express the proposition that snow is white. A common belief among philosophers who use this jargon is that propositions, properly speaking, are what are true or false (what bear truth values; they are truthbearers).

To get a better idea of what it means to express a proposition, compare this to something that does not express a proposition. Suppose someone minding a convenience store sees a thief pick up a candy bar and run. The storekeeper manages to exclaim, "Hey!" In this case, "Hey!" does not express a proposition. Among the things that the exclamation does not express are, "that's a thief there"; "thieving is wrong"; "please stop that thief"; or "that thief really annoys me." The storekeeper isn't saying anything that can be true or false. So it is not a proposition that the storekeeper is expressing. Perhaps it is an emotional state that is being expressed. The storekeeper is surprised and angered, and expresses those feelings by saying, "Hey!"

Ethical cognitivists hold that ethical sentences do express propositions: that it can be true or false, for example, that Mary is a good person, or that stealing and lying are always wrong. Cognitivists believe that these sentences do not just express feelings, as though we were saying, "Hey!" or "Yay for Mary!"; they actually express propositions that can be true or false. Derivatively, a cognitivist or a realist would say that ethical sentences themselves are either true or false. Conversely, if one believes that sentences like "Mary is a good person" cannot be either true or false, then one is a non-cognitivist.

== Cognitivism and subjectivism ==
Ethical subjectivism is the meta-ethical view which claims that:

1. Ethical sentences express propositions.
2. Some such propositions are true.
3. Those propositions are about the attitudes of people.

This makes ethical subjectivism a form of cognitivism. Ethical subjectivism stands in opposition to moral realism, which claims that moral propositions refer to objective facts, independent of human opinion; to error theory, which denies that any moral propositions are true in any sense; and to non-cognitivism, which denies that moral sentences express propositions at all.

The most common forms of ethical subjectivism are also forms of moral relativism, with moral standards held to be relative to each culture or society (cf. cultural relativism), or even to every individual. The latter view, as put forward by Protagoras, holds that there are as many distinct scales of good and evil as there are subjects in the world. However, there are also universalist forms of subjectivism such as ideal observer theory (which claims that moral propositions are about what attitudes a hypothetical ideal observer would hold) and divine command theory (which claims that moral propositions are about what attitudes God holds).

== Cognitivism and objectivism ==
Cognitivism encompasses all forms of moral realism, but cognitivism can also agree with ethical irrealism or anti-realism. Aside from the subjectivist branch of cognitivism, some cognitive irrealist theories accept that ethical sentences can be objectively true or false, even if there exist no natural, physical or in any way real (or "worldly") entities or objects to make them true or false.

There are a number of ways of construing how a proposition can be objectively true without corresponding to the world:

- By the coherence rather than the correspondence theory of truth
- In a figurative sense: it can be true that I have a cold, but that doesn't mean that the word "cold" corresponds to a distinct entity.
- In the way that mathematical statements are true for mathematical anti-realists. This would typically be the idea that a proposition can be true if it is an entailment of some intuitively appealing axiom—in other words, a priori analytical reasoning.

Crispin Wright, John Skorupski and some others defend normative cognitivist irrealism. Wright asserts the extreme implausibility of both J. L. Mackie's error-theory and non-cognitivism (including S. Blackburn's quasi-realism) in view of both everyday and sophisticated moral speech and argument. The same point is often expressed as the Frege-Geach Objection. Skorupski distinguishes between receptive awareness, which is not possible in normative matters, and non-receptive awareness (including dialogical knowledge), which is possible in normative matters.

Hilary Putnam's book Ethics without Ontology (Harvard, 2004) argues for a similar view, that ethical (and for that matter mathematical) sentences can be true and objective without there being any objects to make them so.

Cognitivism points to the semantic difference between imperative sentences and declarative sentences in normative subjects. Or to the different meanings and purposes of some superficially declarative sentences. For instance, if a teacher allows one of her students to go out by saying "You may go out", this sentence is neither true nor false. It gives a permission. But, in most situations, if one of the students asks one of his classmates whether she thinks that he may go out and she answers "Of course you may go out", this sentence is either true or false. It does not give a permission, it states that there is a permission.

Another argument for ethical cognitivism stands on the close resemblance between ethics and other normative matters, such as games. As much as morality, games consist of norms (or rules), but it would be hard to accept that it be not true that the chessplayer who checkmates the other one wins the game. If statements about game rules can be true or false, why not ethical statements? One answer is that we may want ethical statements to be categorically true, while we only need statements about right action to be contingent on the acceptance of the rules of a particular game—that is, the choice to play the game according to a given set of rules.

== See also ==
- Glossary of philosophical isms
- Non-cognitivism
- Transcognition

== Bibliography ==
- Brandt, Richard (1959). "Ethical Naturalism". Ethical Theory. Englewood Cliffs: Prentice Hall. LCCN 59010075.
