= Moral Realism: A Defence =

2003 book by Russ Shafer-Landau

- Author: Russ Shafer-Landau
- Language: English
- Subject: moral realism
- Published: 2003
- Publisher: Oxford University Press
- Media type: Print
- Pages: 336
- ISBN: 0199259755

Moral Realism: A Defence is a 2003 book by Russ Shafer-Landau, in which the author provides a defense of moral realism.

== Reception ==
The book was reviewed by Michael Ridge, Harold Netland, Mark Timmons and Hallvard Lillehammer.
