= Projectivism =

Philosophical position

Projectivism or projectionism in philosophy involves attributing (projecting) qualities to an object as if those qualities actually belong to it. It is a theory for how people interact with the world and has been applied in both ethics and general philosophy. It is derived from the Humean idea that all judgements about the world derive from internal experience, and that people therefore project their emotional state onto the world and interpret it through the lens of their own experience. Projectivism can conflict with moral realism, which asserts that moral judgements can be determined from empirical facts, i.e., some things are objectively right or wrong.

== Origins ==
The origins of projectivism lie with David Hume, who describes the view in Treatise on Human Nature: "Tis a common observation, that the mind has a great propensity to spread itself on external objects, and to conjoin with them any internal impressions, which they occasion, and which always make their appearance at the same time that these objects discover themselves to the senses."

== Hume's projectivist theory of causation ==
Suppose for example that somebody is hit by a hammer, and sometime later a bruise appears at the point of impact. The impact of the hammer is an observable event; the bruise too is observable. The causal connection between the two events, however, is not observed or experienced, at least according to Hume. Hume believed that whenever one can claim to know something about the world, that knowledge must be derived from experience (see Hume's fork). One does not experience the causal connection between a hammer impact and the formation of a bruise. All that is observed are distinct events, occurring at the same place and time (Constant conjunction). Because one observes events of this type, one is led by induction to suppose that like causes will result in like effects, and from this one infers the notion of causation. This does not mean Hume doubted that one material object was able to cause a change or movement in another material object. It means that insofar as one talks about some cause resulting in some effect, it is not something one has learned of the world that is talked about because it is not derived from experience. Rather, one is talking about a feature of one's thinking which one is inclined to discuss as if it were a feature of the world. In short, when one believes one has observed a causal connection all one really has experienced is a conjunction between two separate events. One can only know about the world through experience, so causation as a feature of the world is something unknowable to a human being.

== Non-cognitivist projectivism ==
More recently, Simon Blackburn has been a major proponent of projectivism. Blackburn's projectivism is a version of meta-ethical anti-realism. Blackburn conveys anti-realism as the view that statements which express moral properties are constructed, and realism as the view that moral properties somehow exist independently of moral agents. A further distinction in Blackburn's projectivism is that between cognitivists and non-cognitivists. Cognitivists believe that moral claims are "truth-apt", that is capable of being true or false. Non-cognitivists, on the other hand, believe that moral claims are not truth-apt—not capable of being true or false.

As a non-cognitivist, the projectivist holds that ethical judgments are the product of conative, rather than cognitive psychological processes. A conative psychological process or state is something similar to a stance, attitude, or disposition. These conative psychological processes are in contrast to cognitive ones, which are what are typically thought of when referring to human beings "using their reason" or perhaps being rational (at least in the narrow sense). As highly social creatures whose success as a species has been due primarily to an ability to communicate and cooperate, projectivism holds that the development of a moral interest has actually been in humans' prudential interest.

Blackburn's projectivism, which he calls quasi-realism, is based on the significance of the conative stances that are held. His idea is that these conative stances are the starting point for what the meta-ethical realist labels beliefs or even facts, like that one ought to feed one's children, or that one has moral values—real values that exist out there in the world independent of the self. Since these conative stances are essentially motivating, they can be called desires, and the realist may view them as desires connected to true beliefs about things that exist independent of mental construction. This is because as humans grow and develop, conative stances can become quite refined into a kind of moral sensibility. So for the projectivist, meta-ethical realists confuse moral sense and sensibility. The projectivist position holds that an individual's moral sensibility can become very sophisticated as they age and mature. As one experiences compassion, one comes to value compassion; or with gratitude, one comes to admire being gracious, and consider gratitude a virtue. But the projectivist is not committed to saying that an individual's response to something wrong (i.e. sense) is what determines its rightness or wrongness. The view is that the wrong-making features of actions are external, and they play a role in the development of essentially motivating moral sentiments that guide conduct.

The view is vulnerable to a major concern for the ethical realist: projectivism may collapse into subjectivism or some variety of moral relativism. For example, it may seem that if Hitler truly felt the Holocaust was the right thing to do, the only possible projectivist response would to be that if Hitler truly thought he was doing the right thing, others might say he was wrong, but for him, it was right. But here, projectivism does not collapse into subjectivism. Where a subjectivist sees no moral disagreement (because they believe "X is right" just means "I approve of X"), the projectivist can allow for moral disagreement.

A bigger vulnerability for projectivism is that it lacks explanatory power over meta-ethics, and instead explains it away. Projectivism may stand to meta-ethics as particularism stands to ethics.

== The projectivist theory of probability ==
The meaning of a statement that the probability that a coin lands heads is ½, in projectivist terms, is not that the coin will either land upward or it will not, a feature of the world, but rather that the probability is a measure of one's own ignorance. Frank Ramsey (see his collected papers, edited by D. H. Mellor) and independently Bruno de Finetti, developed projectivist theories of probability in the early twentieth century. To explain their theories, the concept of degree of belief must first be introduced.

Consider for example that a person has a degree of belief of 1 in a particular proposition if they are completely convinced of its truth. For example, most people have a degree of belief of 1 in the proposition that 2+2=4. On the other hand, a person has a degree of belief 0 in a proposition if they are utterly convinced of its falsity; most people have a degree of belief of zero in the proposition that 2+2=5. Intermediate values are possible. A man who thinks that his dog has stolen the sausages, but is not completely sure, might have a degree of belief of 0.8 in the proposition that his dog stole the sausages.

For each person A, one can define a (partial) function CA mapping the set of propositions to the closed interval [0, 1] by stipulating that for a proposition P CA(P)=t if and only if C has a degree of belief t in the proposition P. Ramsey and de Finetti independently attempted to show that if A is rational, CA is a probability function: that is, CA satisfies the standard (Kolmogorov) probability axioms. They supposed that when one describes an event as having probability P, one really is voicing one's degrees of belief. Probabilities are not real features of the world. For example, when saying that the event that the coin lands heads up has probability ½, one does so because one's degree of belief in the proposition that the coin will land heads up is ½.

A counter-argument would be that: "This needs to be restated to show probability in a particular number of flips, not one coin flip, which DOES only have a probability of 1/2 since it only has two sides". This argument is moot, as the probability of the coin either landing on a heads or tails is 1, however, the observer is unable to accurately measure the input variables contributing to the output condition. Thus, in the projectivist view, probability is a measure of the degree to which an observer believes in a given proposition of the outcome of an event.

== See also ==
- Fallibilism
- Mind projection fallacy
- Moral philosophy
- Perspectivism
- Philosophy of perception
- Relativism
- Subjectivism
