= Ethics and Language =

- First edition
- Author: C. L. Stevenson
- Language: English
- Subject: Emotivism
- Publisher: Yale University Press
- Publication date: 1944
- Publication place: England
- Media type: Print (Hardcover)
- Pages: 338

Ethics and Language is a 1944 book by C. L. Stevenson which was influential in furthering the metaethical view of emotivism first espoused by A. J. Ayer. Yale University, where Stevenson lectured, did not approve of the contents of the book, as a result his lecture position was not renewed.
