= The Oxford Dictionary of Philosophy =

1994 book by Simon Blackburn

- Cover of the first edition
- Author: Simon Blackburn
- Language: English
- Subject: Philosophy
- Publisher: Oxford University Press
- Publication date: 1994
- Publication place: United Kingdom
- Media type: Print (hardcover and paperback)
- Pages: 408
- ISBN: 978-0199541430

The Oxford Dictionary of Philosophy (1994; second edition 2008; third edition 2016) is a dictionary of philosophy by the philosopher Simon Blackburn, published by Oxford University Press.
