= Modal fictionalism =

Philosophical concept

Modal fictionalism is a term used in philosophy, and more specifically in the metaphysics of modality, to describe the position that holds that modality can be analysed in terms of a fiction about possible worlds. The theory comes in two versions: strong and timid. Both positions were first exposed by Gideon Rosen, starting from 1990.

== Strong fictionalism about possible worlds ==
According to strong fictionalism about possible worlds (another name for strong modal fictionalism), the following bi-conditionals are necessary and specify the truth-conditions for certain cases of modal claims:

1. It is possible that P iff the translation of P into the language of a fiction F (containing possible worlds) holds according to F.
2. It is necessary that P iff the translation of P into the language of a fiction F (containing possible worlds) always holds.

Recent supporters of this view added further specifications of these bi-conditionals to counter certain objections. In the case of claims of possibility, the revised bi-conditional is thus spelled out: (1.1) it is possible that P iff At this universe, presently, the translation of P into the language of a fiction F holds according to F.

== Timid fictionalism about possible worlds ==
According to a timid version of fictionalism about possible worlds, our possible worlds can be properly understood as involving reference to a fiction, but the aforementioned bi-conditionals should not be taken as an analysis of certain cases of modality.

== See also ==
- Fictionalism

== Sources ==
- "Modal fictionalism" at the Stanford Encyclopedia of Philosophy
- "Modal Fictionalism and Possible Worlds Semantics" at the Stanford Encyclopedia of Philosophy
- "Modal fictionalism" by Gideon Rosen, Mind, 99, 395 (1990), pp. 327–354.
- "Modal Fictionalism and Analysis" by Seahwa Kim in Mark Eli Kalderon (ed.), Fictionalism in Metaphysics (Oxford: Oxford University Press, 2005), pp. 116–33.
- "Modal Fictionalism, Possible Worlds, and Artificiality" by Andrea Sauchelli, 'Modal Fictionalism, Possible Worlds, and Artificiality', Acta Analytica 28(4):411–21 (2013).
