= Universal prescriptivism =

Meta-ethical view

Universal prescriptivism (often simply called prescriptivism) is the meta-ethical view that claims that, rather than expressing propositions, ethical sentences function similarly to imperatives which are universalizable—whoever makes a moral judgment is committed to the same judgment in any situation where the same relevant facts pertain.

This makes prescriptivism a universalist form of non-cognitivism. Prescriptivism stands in opposition to other forms of non-cognitivism (such as emotivism and quasi-realism), as well as to all forms of cognitivism (including both moral realism and ethical subjectivism).

Since prescriptivism was introduced by philosopher R. M. Hare in his 1952 book The Language of Morals, it has been compared to emotivism and to the categorical imperative of Immanuel Kant. Unlike Kant, however, Hare does not invoke universalizability as a test of moral permissibility. Instead, he sees it as a consistency requirement that is built into the logic of moral language and helps to make moral thinking a rational enterprise.

== What prescriptivists claim ==
Hare originally proposed prescriptivism as a kind of amendment to emotivism. Like emotivists, Hare believes that moral discourse is not primarily informative or fact-stating. But whereas emotivists claim that moral language is mainly intended to express feelings or to influence behavior, Hare believes that the central purpose of moral talk is to guide behavior by telling someone what to do. Its main purpose is to “prescribe” (recommend) a certain act, not to get someone to do that act or to express one's personal feelings or attitudes.

To illustrate the prescriptivist view, consider the moral sentence, “Suicide is wrong.” According to moral realism, such a sentence claims there to be some objective property of “wrongness” associated with the act of suicide. According to some versions of emotivism, such a sentence merely expresses an attitude of the speaker; it only means something like “Boo on suicide!”, but according to prescriptivism, the statement “Suicide is wrong” means something more like “Do not commit suicide.”. What it expresses is thus not primarily a description or an emotion, but an imperative. General value terms like “good”, “bad”, “right”, “wrong” and “ought” usually also have descriptive and emotive meanings, but these are not their primary meanings according to prescriptivists.

== Criticisms ==
Prescriptivism has faced extensive criticism and currently has few adherents. Ethicists commonly dispute Hare's assertion that moral language lacks informativeness, challenging the idea that the primary purpose of moral discourse is not to convey moral truths or facts. Hare's argument that offering guidance always constitutes the primary goal of moral discourse is also questioned by numerous critics.

Some critics observe that Hare seems to presume moral language is exclusively employed in discussions, debates, or commands, where one person instructs another or others on what to do. This perspective, it is argued, overlooks the broader usage of moral talk as a "language-game" serving diverse purposes. Lastly, critics contend that prescriptivism contradicts the common-sense differentiation between good and bad reasons for holding moral beliefs.

Hare's stance suggests that a racist "fanatic" advocating the deportation of all minority-group members, while maintaining consistency (even if the racist is a member of the minority group), cannot be criticized for either irrationality or falsehood. Kerner argues that, for Hare, morality fundamentally involves non-rational choice and commitment. However, critics of Hare argue that reason should and does play a more substantial role in ethics than he acknowledges.

== See also ==
- Non-cognitivism
- Expressivism
