= Gideon Rosen =

American philosopher (born 1963)

- Born: October 1963 (age 62)
- Spouse: Lisa Eckstrom

Education
- Education: Columbia University (BA); Princeton University (PhD)
- Doctoral advisor: Paul Benacerraf

Philosophical work
- Era: Contemporary philosophy
- Region: Western philosophy
- School: Analytic philosophy
- Main interests: Metaphysics, philosophy of mathematics, ethics
- Notable ideas: Modal fictionalism Anti-nominalism in the philosophy of mathematics

Gideon Rosen (born 1963) is an American philosopher. He is a Stuart Professor of Philosophy at Princeton University, where he specializes in metaphysics, philosophy of mathematics, and ethics.

== Education and career ==
Rosen graduated from Columbia University in 1984 and obtained his Ph.D. at Princeton in 1992, under the supervision of Paul Benacerraf. He taught at the University of Michigan, Ann Arbor for several years before joining the Princeton faculty in 1993. He has served as chair of Princeton's Council of the Humanities and director of the Behrman Undergraduate Society of Fellows.

He was elected a Fellow of the American Academy of Arts and Sciences in 2024.

== Philosophical work ==
In 1990 Rosen introduced modal fictionalism, a popular position on the ontological status of possible worlds. He is the co-author of A Subject with No Object (Oxford University Press, 1997), a contribution to the philosophy of mathematics written with Princeton colleague John P. Burgess. His recent work in metaphysics is about the concept of ground.

In moral philosophy, Rosen argues for a new variety of skepticism about moral responsibility, separate from the traditional dilemma posed by the compatibilism (incompatibilism) problem. According to Rosen, there is an epistemic problem for positive judgments of responsibility: such judgments are never justified because they are necessarily under-evidenced in a certain way, due to the nature of normativity and normative ignorance.

== Selected articles ==
- "Modal Fictionalism," Mind 99 (1990): 327-354.
- "What is Constructive Empiricism?" Philosophical Studies 74 (1994): 143-178.
- "Modal Fictionalism Fixed," Analysis 55 (1995): 67-73.
- "Nominalism, Naturalism, Epistemic Relativism," Noûs 35 (2001): 69-91.
- "Culpability and Ignorance," Proceedings of the Aristotelian Society 103 (2002): 61–84.
- "Kleinbart the Oblivious and Other Tales of Ignorance and Responsibility," Journal of Philosophy 105 (2008): 591-610.
- "Metaphysical Dependence: Grounding and Reduction," in B. Hale & A. Hoffmann (eds.), Modality: Metaphysics, Logic, and Epistemology (Oxford University Press, 2010).
- "Culpability and Duress: A Case Study," Aristotelian Society Supplementary Volume 88 (2014): 69-90.
