= Lee Braver =

American philosopher

- Born: 1969 (age 56–57)

Education
- Education: Pennsylvania State University

Philosophical work
- Era: Contemporary philosophy
- Region: Western philosophy
- School: analytic philosophy Continental philosophy
- Institutions: University of South Florida
- Main interests: Metaphysics

Lee Braver (born 1969) is an American philosopher and a Courtesy Professor of Philosophy at the University of South Florida. He works at the intersection of analytic philosophy and continental philosophy, especially through the lenses of Martin Heidegger and Ludwig Wittgenstein.

== Books ==
- Braver, Lee (2007). A Thing of This World: A History of Continental Anti-Realism. Topics in historical philosophy. Evanston, Ill: Northwestern University Press. ISBN 978-0-8101-2379-3.
- Braver, Lee (2009). Heidegger's Later Writings: A Reader's Guide. Continuum reader's guides. London; New York: Continuum. ISBN 978-0-8264-2211-8.
- Braver, Lee (2012). Groundless Grounds: A Study of Wittgenstein and Heidegger. Cambridge, Mass: MIT Press. ISBN 978-0-262-01689-6.
- Braver, Lee (2014). Heidegger: Thinking of Being. Key contemporary thinkers. Cambridge, UK: Polity Press. ISBN 978-0-7456-6491-0.
- Braver, Lee; Badiou, Alain, eds. (2015). Division III of Heidegger's Being and time: the unanswered question of being. Cambridge, Massachusetts: The MIT Press. ISBN 978-0-262-02968-1.
