= Charles Stevenson (philosopher) =

American analytic philosopher (1908–1979)

- Born: Charles Leslie Stevenson; June 27, 1908; Cincinnati, Ohio, U.S.
- Died: March 14, 1979 (aged 70); Bennington, Vermont, U.S.
- Spouses: Louise Destler Stevenson (m. 1930; died 1963); Nora Stevenson (m. 1965)
- Children: 4, including Anne

Education
- Education: Yale University; Jesus College, Cambridge; Harvard University
- Thesis: The Emotive Meaning of Ethical Terms (1935)
- Academic advisors: G. E. Moore; Ralph Barton Perry; Ludwig Wittgenstein

Philosophical work
- Era: 20th-century philosophy
- Region: Western philosophy
- School: Analytic philosophy
- Institutions: University of Michigan; Bennington College
- Doctoral students: Joel Feinberg
- Main interests: Meta-ethics; ethics; aesthetics
- Notable works: Ethics and Language
- Notable ideas: Emotivism

Charles Leslie Stevenson (June 27, 1908 – March 14, 1979) was an American analytic philosopher best known for his work in ethics and aesthetics.

== Biography ==
Stevenson was born on June 27, 1908, in Cincinnati, Ohio. He was educated at Yale, receiving in 1930 a Bachelor of Arts (BA) degree in English literature, at Jesus College, Cambridge, where in 1933 he was awarded a BA degree in moral sciences (philosophy), and at Harvard, getting his Doctor of Philosophy degree there in 1935. While at Cambridge he studied under Ludwig Wittgenstein and G. E. Moore. He was an instructor at Yale University from 1939 to 1944, spending some of that time teaching mathematics to wartime naval recruits. His post was not renewed in 1944 because the department did not approve of the metaethical views he espoused in his book Ethics and Language (1944).

After a period on a Guggenheim fellowship at Berkeley, Pomona, and Chicago, he was appointed to the University of Michigan where he taught from 1946 to 1977. Among his students was Joel Feinberg.

He gave the most sophisticated defense of emotivism in the post-war period. In his papers "The Emotive Meaning of Ethical Terms" (1937) and "Persuasive Definitions" (1938), and his book Ethics and Language (1944), he developed a theory of emotive meaning; which he then used to provide a foundation for his theory of a persuasive definition. He furthermore advanced emotivism as a meta-ethical theory that sharply delineated between cognitive, scientific uses of language (used to state facts and to give reasons, and subject to the laws of science) and non-cognitive uses (used to state feelings and exercise influence).

In 1978 a joint festschrift dedicated to Stevenson, William Frankena, and Richard Booker Brandt was published, it was titled Values and Morals.

Stevenson died on March 14, 1979, in Bennington, Vermont.

Stevenson married Louise Destler. Among their children was the poet Anne Stevenson.

== Contributions to philosophy ==
Stevenson's work has been seen both as an elaboration upon A. J. Ayer's views and as a representation of one of "two broad types of ethical emotivism." An analytic philosopher, Stevenson suggested in his 1937 essay "The Emotive Meaning of Ethical Terms" that any ethical theory should explain three things: that intelligent disagreement can occur over moral questions, that moral terms like good are "magnetic" in encouraging action, and that the scientific method is insufficient for verifying moral claims. Stevenson's own theory was fully developed in his 1944 book Ethics and Language. In it, he agrees with Ayer that ethical sentences express the speaker's feelings, but he adds that they also have an imperative component intended to change the listener's feelings and that this component is of greater importance. Where Ayer spoke of values, or fundamental psychological inclinations, Stevenson speaks of attitudes, and where Ayer spoke of disagreement of fact, or rational disputes over the application of certain values to a particular case, Stevenson speaks of differences in belief; the concepts are the same. Terminology aside, Stevenson interprets ethical statements according to two patterns of analysis.

=== First pattern analysis ===
Under his first pattern of analysis, an ethical statement has two parts: a declaration of the speaker's attitude and an imperative to mirror it, so "'This is good' means I approve of this; do so as well." The first half of the sentence is a proposition, but the imperative half is not, so Stevenson's translation of an ethical sentence remains a noncognitive one.

Imperatives cannot be proved, but they can still be supported so that the listener understands that they are not wholly arbitrary:

If told to close the door, one may ask "Why?" and receive some such reason as "It is too drafty," or "The noise is distracting." … These reasons cannot be called "proofs" in any but a dangerously extended sense, nor are they demonstratively or inductively related to an imperative; but they manifestly do support an imperative. They "back it up," or "establish it," or "base it on concrete references to fact."

The purpose of these supports is to make the listener understand the consequences of the action they are being commanded to do. Once they understand the command's consequences, they can determine whether or not obedience to the command will have desirable results.

The imperative is used to alter the hearer's attitudes or actions. … The supporting reason then describes the situation which the imperative seeks to alter, or the new situation which the imperative seeks to bring about; and if these facts disclose that the new situation will satisfy a preponderance of the hearer's desires, he will hesitate to obey no longer. More generally, reasons support imperatives by altering such beliefs as may in turn alter an unwillingness to obey.

=== Second pattern analysis ===
Stevenson's second pattern of analysis is used for statements about types of actions, not specific actions. Under this pattern,

'This is good' has the meaning of 'This has qualities or relations X, Y, Z … ,' except that 'good' has as well a laudatory meaning which permits it to express the speaker's approval, and tends to evoke the approval of the hearer.

In second-pattern analysis, rather than judge an action directly, the speaker is evaluating it according to a general principle. For instance, someone who says "Murder is wrong" might mean "Murder decreases happiness overall"; this is a second-pattern statement which leads to a first-pattern one: "I disapprove of anything which decreases happiness overall. Do so as well."

=== Methods of argumentation ===
For Stevenson, moral disagreements may arise from different fundamental attitudes, different moral beliefs about specific cases, or both. The methods of moral argumentation he proposed have been divided into three groups, known as logical, rational psychological and nonrational psychological forms of argumentation.

Logical methods involve efforts to show inconsistencies between a person's fundamental attitudes and their particular moral beliefs. For example, someone who says "Edward is a good person" who has previously said "Edward is a thief" and "No thieves are good people" is guilty of inconsistency until she retracts one of her statements. Similarly, a person who says "Lying is always wrong" might consider lies in some situations to be morally permissible, and if examples of these situations can be given, his view can be shown to be logically inconsistent.

Rational psychological methods examine the facts which relate fundamental attitudes to particular moral beliefs; the goal is not to show that someone has been inconsistent, as with logical methods, but only that they are wrong about the facts which connect their attitudes to their beliefs. To modify the former example, consider the person who holds that all thieves are bad people. If she sees Edward pocket a wallet found in a public place, she may conclude that he is a thief, and there would be no inconsistency between her attitude (that thieves are bad people) and her belief (that Edward is a bad person because he is a thief). However, it may be that Edward recognized the wallet as belonging to a friend, to whom he promptly returned it. Such a revelation would likely change the observer's belief about Edward, and even if it did not, the attempt to reveal such facts would count as a rational psychological form of moral argumentation.

Non-rational psychological methods revolve around language with psychological influence but no necessarily logical connection to the listener's attitudes. Stevenson called the primary such method "'persuasive,' in a somewhat broadened sense", and wrote:

[Persuasion] depends on the sheer, direct emotional impact of words—on emotive meaning, rhetorical cadence, apt metaphor, stentorian, stimulating, or pleading tones of voice, dramatic gestures, care in establishing rapport with the hearer or audience, and so on. … A redirection of the hearer's attitudes is sought not by the mediating step of altering his beliefs, but by exhortation, whether obvious or subtle, crude or refined.

Persuasion may involve the use of particular emotion-laden words, like "democracy" or "dictator", or hypothetical questions like "What if everyone thought the way you do?" or "How would you feel if you were in their shoes?"

== Bibliography ==
=== Books ===
- Ethics and Language (1944)
- Facts and Values (1963), ISBN 0-8371-8212-3

=== Papers ===
- "The Emotive Meaning of Ethical Terms" in Mind, Vol. 46, No. 181 (Jan., 1937), pp. 14-31.
- "Ethical Judgments and Avoidability" in Mind, Vol. 47, No. 185 (Jan., 1938), pp. 45-57.
- "Persuasive Definitions" in Mind Vol. 47, No. 187 (Jul., 1938), pp. 331-350.
- "Some Relations between Philosophy and the Study of Language" in Analysis, Vol. 8, No. 1 (Oct., 1947), pp. 1-9.
- "Meaning: Descriptive and Emotive" in The Philosophical Review, Vol. 57, No. 2 (Mar., 1948), pp. 127-144.
- "On "What is a Poem?"" in The Philosophical Review, Vol. 66, No. 3 (Jul., 1957), pp. 329-362.
- "On the "Analysis" of a Work of Art" in The Philosophical Review, Vol. 67, No. 1 (Jan., 1958), pp. 33-51.
- "Reflections on John Dewey's Ethics" in Proceedings of the Aristotelian Society, New Series, Vol. 62 (1961 - 1962), pp. 77-98.
- "Interpretation and Evaluation in Aesthetics" in Max Black (ed.) Philosophical Analysis (1963).
- "If-Iculties" in Philosophy of Science, Vol. 37, No. 1 (Mar., 1970), pp. 27-49.

== See also ==
- American philosophy
- List of American philosophers

== Sources ==
- Boisvert, Daniel R. "Charles Leslie Stevenson". In Zalta, Edward N. (ed.). Stanford Encyclopedia of Philosophy. ISSN 1095-5054. OCLC 429049174.
- The Penguin Dictionary of Philosophy, ed. Thomas Mautner. Penguin Putnam Inc. ISBN 0-14-051250-0

Professional and academic associations
Preceded by Arthur Campbell Garnett	President of the American Philosophical; Association, Central Division; 1961–1962	Succeeded by Herbert Feigl
