= Fictionalism =

Pretending to treat something as literally true (a "useful fiction")

Fictionalism is a view in philosophy that posits that statements appearing to be descriptions of the world should not be construed as such, but should instead be understood as cases of "make believe", thus allowing individuals to treat something as literally true (a "useful fiction").

== Concept ==
Fictionalism consists in at least the following three theses:

1. Claims made within the domain of discourse are taken to be truth-apt; that is, true or false.
2. The domain of discourse is to be interpreted at face value—not reduced to meaning something else.
3. The aim of discourse in any given domain is not truth, but some other virtue(s) (e.g., simplicity, explanatory scope).

Two important strands of fictionalism are: modal fictionalism developed by Gideon Rosen, which states that possible worlds, regardless of whether they exist or not, may be a part of a useful discourse, and mathematical fictionalism advocated by Hartry Field.

Modal fictionalism is recognized as further refinement to the basic fictionalism as it holds that representations of possible worlds in texts are useful fictions. Conceptualization explains that it is a descriptive theorizing of what a text, such as the Bible, amounts to. It is also associated with linguistic ersatzism in the sense that both are views possible worlds.

Fictionalism, on the other hand, in the philosophy of mathematics states that talk of numbers and other mathematical objects is nothing more than a convenience for computation. According to Field, there is no reason to treat parts of mathematics that involve reference to or quantification as true. In this discourse, mathematical objects are accorded the same metaphysical status as literary figures such as Macbeth.

Also in meta-ethics, there is an equivalent position called moral fictionalism (championed by Richard Joyce). Many modern versions of fictionalism are influenced by the work of Kendall Walton in aesthetics.

== See also ==
- Color fictionalism
- Hans Vaihinger
- Moral nihilism
- Noble lie
- Philosophy of color
- Pragmatism
- Quietism (philosophy)
