= Emotivism =

Meta-ethical view

Emotivism is a meta-ethical view that claims ethical sentences do not express propositions but emotional attitudes. Hence, it is colloquially known as the hurrah/boo theory. Influenced by the growth of analytic philosophy and logical positivism in the 20th century, the theory was stated vividly by A. J. Ayer in his 1936 book Language, Truth and Logic, but its development owes more to C. L. Stevenson.

Emotivism can be considered a form of non-cognitivism or expressivism. It stands in opposition to other forms of non-cognitivism (such as quasi-realism and universal prescriptivism), as well as to all forms of cognitivism (including both moral realism and ethical subjectivism).

In the 1950s, emotivism appeared in a modified form in the universal prescriptivism of R. M. Hare.

== History ==
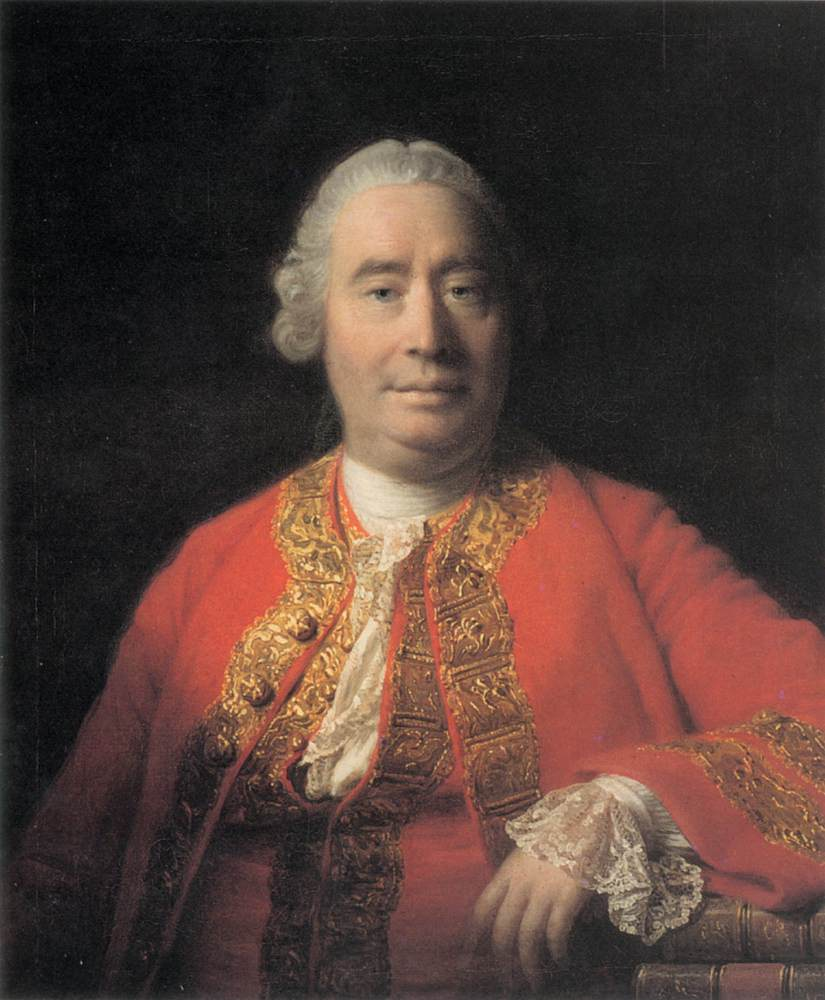
David Hume's statements on ethics foreshadowed those of 20th century emotivists.

Emotivism reached prominence in the early 20th century, but it was born centuries earlier. In 1710, George Berkeley wrote that language in general often serves to inspire feelings as well as communicate ideas. Decades later, David Hume espoused ideas similar to Stevenson's later ones. In his 1751 book An Enquiry Concerning the Principles of Morals, Hume considered morality not to be related to fact but "determined by sentiment":

In moral deliberations we must be acquainted beforehand with all the objects, and all their relations to each other; and from a comparison of the whole, fix our choice or approbation. … While we are ignorant whether a man were aggressor or not, how can we determine whether the person who killed him be criminal or innocent? But after every circumstance, every relation is known, the understanding has no further room to operate, nor any object on which it could employ itself. The approbation or blame which then ensues, cannot be the work of the judgement, but of the heart; and is not a speculative proposition or affirmation, but an active feeling or sentiment.

G. E. Moore published his Principia Ethica in 1903 and argued that the attempts of ethical naturalists to translate ethical terms (like good and bad) into non-ethical ones (like pleasing and displeasing) committed the "naturalistic fallacy". Moore was a cognitivist, but his case against ethical naturalism steered other philosophers toward noncognitivism, particularly emotivism.

The emergence of logical positivism and its verifiability criterion of meaning early in the 20th century led some philosophers to conclude that ethical statements, being incapable of empirical verification, were cognitively meaningless. This criterion was fundamental to A. J. Ayer's defense of positivism in Language, Truth and Logic, which contains his statement of emotivism. However, positivism is not essential to emotivism itself, perhaps not even in Ayer's form, and some positivists in the Vienna Circle, which had great influence on Ayer, held non-emotivist views.

R. M. Hare unfolded his ethical theory of universal prescriptivism in 1952's The Language of Morals, intending to defend the importance of rational moral argumentation against the "propaganda" he saw encouraged by Stevenson, who thought moral argumentation was sometimes psychological and not rational. But Hare's disagreement was not universal, and the similarities between his noncognitive theory and the emotive one — especially his claim, and Stevenson's, that moral judgments contain commands and are thus not purely descriptive — caused some to regard him as an emotivist, a classification he denied:

I did, and do, follow the emotivists in their rejection of descriptivism. But I was never an emotivist, though I have often been called one. But unlike most of their opponents I saw that it was their irrationalism, not their non-descriptivism, which was mistaken. So my main task was to find a rationalist kind of non-descriptivism, and this led me to establish that imperatives, the simplest kinds of prescriptions, could be subject to logical constraints while not [being] descriptive.

== Proponents ==
Influential statements of emotivism were made by C. K. Ogden and I. A. Richards in their 1923 book on language, The Meaning of Meaning, and by W. H. F. Barnes and A. Duncan-Jones in independent works on ethics in 1934. However, it is the later works of Ayer and especially Stevenson that are the most developed and discussed defenses of the theory.

=== A. J. Ayer ===
A. J. Ayer's version of emotivism is given in chapter six, "Critique of Ethics and Theology", of Language, Truth and Logic. In that chapter, Ayer divides "the ordinary system of ethics" into four classes:

1. "Propositions which express definitions of ethical terms, or judgements about the legitimacy or possibility of certain definitions"
2. "Propositions describing the phenomena of moral experience, and their causes"
3. "Exhortations to moral virtue"
4. "Actual ethical judgments"

He focuses on propositions of the first class—moral judgments—saying that those of the second class belong to science, those of the third are mere commands, and those of the fourth (which are considered in normative ethics as opposed to meta-ethics) are too concrete for ethical philosophy. While class three statements were irrelevant to Ayer's brand of emotivism, they would later play a significant role in Stevenson's.

Ayer argues that moral judgments cannot be translated into non-ethical, empirical terms and thus cannot be verified; in this he agrees with ethical intuitionists. But he differs from intuitionists by discarding appeals to intuition as "worthless" for determining moral truths, since the intuition of one person often contradicts that of another. Instead, Ayer concludes that ethical concepts are "mere pseudo-concepts":

The presence of an ethical symbol in a proposition adds nothing to its factual content. Thus if I say to someone, "You acted wrongly in stealing that money," I am not stating anything more than if I had simply said, "You stole that money." In adding that this action is wrong I am not making any further statement about it. I am simply evincing my moral disapproval of it. It is as if I had said, "You stole that money," in a peculiar tone of horror, or written it with the addition of some special exclamation marks. … If now I generalise my previous statement and say, "Stealing money is wrong," I produce a sentence which has no factual meaning—that is, expresses no proposition which can be either true or false. … I am merely expressing certain moral sentiments.

Ayer agrees with subjectivists in saying that ethical statements are necessarily related to individual attitudes, but he says they lack truth value because they cannot be properly understood as propositions about those attitudes; Ayer thinks ethical sentences are expressions, not assertions, of approval. While an assertion of approval may always be accompanied by an expression of approval, expressions can be made without making assertions; Ayer's example is boredom, which can be expressed through the stated assertion "I am bored" or through non-assertions including tone of voice, body language, and various other verbal statements. He sees ethical statements as expressions of the latter sort, so the phrase "Theft is wrong" is a non-propositional sentence which is an expression of disapproval but is not equivalent to the proposition "I disapprove of theft".

Having argued that his theory of ethics is noncognitive and not subjective, he accepts that his position and subjectivism are equally confronted by G. E. Moore's argument that ethical disputes are clearly genuine disputes and not just expressions of contrary feelings. Ayer's defense is that all ethical disputes are about facts regarding the proper application of a value system to a specific case, not about the value systems themselves, because any dispute about values can only be resolved by judging that one value system is superior to another, and this judgment itself presupposes a shared value system. If Moore is wrong in saying that there are actual disagreements of value, we are left with the claim that there are actual disagreements of fact, and Ayer accepts this without hesitation:

If our opponent concurs with us in expressing moral disapproval of a given type t, then we may get him to condemn a particular action A, by bringing forward arguments to show that A is of type t. For the question whether A does or does not belong to that type is a plain question of fact.

=== C. L. Stevenson ===
Stevenson's work has been seen both as an elaboration upon Ayer's views and as a representation of one of "two broad types of ethical emotivism." An analytic philosopher, Stevenson suggested in his 1937 essay "The Emotive Meaning of Ethical Terms" that any ethical theory should explain three things: that intelligent disagreement can occur over moral questions, that moral terms like good are "magnetic" in encouraging action, and that the scientific method is insufficient for verifying moral claims. Stevenson's own theory was fully developed in his 1944 book Ethics and Language. In it, he agrees with Ayer that ethical sentences express the speaker's feelings, but he adds that they also have an imperative component intended to change the listener's feelings and that this component is of greater importance. Where Ayer spoke of values, or fundamental psychological inclinations, Stevenson speaks of attitudes, and where Ayer spoke of disagreement of fact, or rational disputes over the application of certain values to a particular case, Stevenson speaks of differences in belief; the concepts are the same. Terminology aside, Stevenson interprets ethical statements according to two patterns of analysis.

==== First pattern analysis ====
Under his first pattern of analysis an ethical statement has two parts: a declaration of the speaker's attitude and an imperative to mirror it, so "'This is good' means I approve of this; do so as well." The first half of the sentence is a proposition, but the imperative half is not, so Stevenson's translation of an ethical sentence remains a noncognitive one.

Imperatives cannot be proved, but they can still be supported so that the listener understands that they are not wholly arbitrary:

If told to close the door, one may ask "Why?" and receive some such reason as "It is too drafty," or "The noise is distracting." … These reasons cannot be called "proofs" in any but a dangerously extended sense, nor are they demonstratively or inductively related to an imperative; but they manifestly do support an imperative. They "back it up," or "establish it," or "base it on concrete references to fact."

The purpose of these supports is to make the listener understand the consequences of the action they are being commanded to do. Once they understand the command's consequences, they can determine whether or not obedience to the command will have desirable results.

The imperative is used to alter the hearer's attitudes or actions. … The supporting reason then describes the situation which the imperative seeks to alter, or the new situation which the imperative seeks to bring about; and if these facts disclose that the new situation will satisfy a preponderance of the hearer's desires, he will hesitate to obey no longer. More generally, reasons support imperatives by altering such beliefs as may in turn alter an unwillingness to obey.

==== Second pattern analysis ====
Stevenson's second pattern of analysis is used for statements about types of actions, not specific actions. Under this pattern,

'This is good' has the meaning of 'This has qualities or relations X, Y, Z … ,' except that 'good' has as well a laudatory meaning, which permits it to express the speaker's approval, and tends to evoke the approval of the hearer.

In second-pattern analysis, rather than judge an action directly, the speaker is evaluating it according to a general principle. For instance, someone who says "Murder is wrong" might mean "Murder decreases happiness overall"; this is a second-pattern statement which leads to a first-pattern one: "I disapprove of anything which decreases happiness overall. Do so as well."

==== Methods of argumentation ====
For Stevenson, moral disagreements may arise from different fundamental attitudes, different moral beliefs about specific cases, or both. The methods of moral argumentation he proposed have been divided into three groups, known as logical, rational psychological and nonrational psychological forms of argumentation.

Logical methods involve efforts to show inconsistencies between a person's fundamental attitudes and their particular moral beliefs. For example, someone who says "Edward is a good person" who has previously said "Edward is a thief" and "No thieves are good people" is guilty of inconsistency until he retracts one of his statements. Similarly, a person who says "Lying is always wrong" might consider lies in some situations to be morally permissible, and if examples of these situations can be given, his view can be shown to be logically inconsistent.

Rational psychological methods examine facts that relate fundamental attitudes to particular moral beliefs; the goal is not to show that someone has been inconsistent, as with logical methods, but only that they are wrong about the facts that connect their attitudes to their beliefs. To modify the former example, consider the person who holds that all thieves are bad people. If she sees Edward pocket a wallet found in a public place, she may conclude that he is a thief, and there would be no inconsistency between her attitude (that thieves are bad people) and her belief (that Edward is a bad person because he is a thief). However, it may be that Edward recognized the wallet as belonging to a friend, to whom he promptly returned it. Such a revelation would likely change the observer's belief about Edward, and even if it did not, the attempt to reveal such facts would count as a rational psychological form of moral argumentation.

Non-rational psychological methods revolve around language with psychological influence but no necessarily logical connection to the listener's attitudes. Stevenson called the primary such method "'persuasive,' in a somewhat broadened sense", and wrote:

[Persuasion] depends on the sheer, direct emotional impact of words—on emotive meaning, rhetorical cadence, apt metaphor, stentorian, stimulating, or pleading tones of voice, dramatic gestures, care in establishing rapport with the hearer or audience, and so on. … A redirection of the hearer's attitudes is sought not by the mediating step of altering his beliefs, but by exhortation, whether obvious or subtle, crude or refined.

Persuasion may involve the use of particular emotion-laden words, like "democracy" or "dictator", or hypothetical questions like "What if everyone thought the way you do?" or "How would you feel if you were in their shoes?"

== Criticism ==
Utilitarian philosopher Richard Brandt offered several criticisms of emotivism in his 1959 book Ethical Theory. His first is that ethical expressions "should be viewed as statements." Brandt believes that historically speaking most people have considered ethical sentences to be "fact-stating" and not just emotive, but emotivism cannot explain this. Furthermore, he argues that people who change their moral views see their prior views as mistaken, not just different, and that this does not make sense if their attitudes were all that changed:

Suppose, for instance, as a child a person disliked eating peas. When he recalls this as an adult he is amused and notes how preferences change with age. He does not say, however, that his former attitude was mistaken. If, on the other hand, he remembers regarding irreligion or divorce as wicked, and now does not, he regards his former view as erroneous and unfounded. … Ethical statements do not look like the kind of thing the emotive theory says they are.

James Urmson's 1968 book The Emotive Theory of Ethics also disagreed with many of Stevenson's points in Ethics and Language, "a work of great value" with "a few serious mistakes [that] led Stevenson consistently to distort his otherwise valuable insights".

=== Magnetic influence ===
Brandt criticized what he termed "the 'magnetic influence' thesis", the idea of Stevenson that ethical statements are meant to influence the listener's attitudes. Brandt contends that most ethical statements, including judgments of people who are not within listening range, are not made with the intention to alter the attitudes of others. Twenty years earlier, W. D. Ross offered much the same criticism in his book Foundations of Ethics. Ross suggests that the emotivist theory seems to be coherent only when dealing with simple linguistic acts, such as recommending, commanding, or passing judgement on something happening at the same point of time as the utterance.

… There is no doubt that such words as 'you ought to do so-and-so' may be used as one's means of so inducing a person to behave a certain way. But if we are to do justice to the meaning of 'right' or 'ought', we must take account also of such modes of speech as 'he ought to do so-and-so', 'you ought to have done so-and-so', 'if this and that were the case, you ought to have done so-and-so', 'if this and that were the case, you ought to do so-and-so', 'I ought to do so-and-so.' Where the judgement of obligation has referenced either a third person, not the person addressed, or to the past, or to an unfulfilled past condition, or to a future treated as merely possible, or to the speaker himself, there is no plausibility in describing the judgement as command.

According to this view, it would make little sense to translate a statement such as "Galileo should not have been forced to recant on heliocentricism" into a command, imperative, or recommendation - to do so might require a radical change in the meaning of these ethical statements. Under this criticism, it would appear as if emotivist and prescriptivist theories are only capable of converting a relatively small subset of all ethical claims into imperatives.

Like Ross and Brandt, Urmson disagrees with Stevenson's "causal theory" of emotive meaning—the theory that moral statements only have emotive meaning when they are made to change in a listener's attitude—saying that is incorrect in explaining "evaluative force in purely causal terms". This is Urmson's fundamental criticism, and he suggests that Stevenson would have made a stronger case by explaining emotive meaning in terms of "commending and recommending attitudes", not in terms of "the power to evoke attitudes".

Stevenson's Ethics and Language, written after Ross's book but before Brandt's and Urmson's, states that emotive terms are "not always used for purposes of exhortation." For example, in the sentence "Slavery was good in Ancient Rome", Stevenson thinks one is speaking of past attitudes in an "almost purely descriptive" sense. And in some discussions of current attitudes, "agreement in attitude can be taken for granted," so a judgment like "He was wrong to kill them" might describe one's attitudes yet be "emotively inactive", with no real emotive (or imperative) meaning. Stevenson is doubtful that sentences in such contexts qualify as normative ethical sentences, maintaining that "for the contexts that are most typical of normative ethics, the ethical terms have a function that is both emotive and descriptive."

=== Philippa Foot's moral realism ===
Philippa Foot adopts a moral realist position, criticizing the idea that when evaluation is superposed on fact there has been a "committal in a new dimension." She introduces, by analogy, the practical implications of using the word injury. Not just anything counts as an injury. There must be some impairment. When we suppose a man wants the things the injury prevents him from obtaining, have not we fallen into the old naturalist fallacy?

It may seem that the only way to make a necessary connexion between 'injury' and the things that are to be avoided, is to say that it is only used in an 'action-guiding sense' when applied to something the speaker intends to avoid. But we should look carefully at the crucial move in that argument, and query the suggestion that someone might happen not to want anything for which he would need the use of hands or eyes. Hands and eyes, like ears and legs, play a part in so many operations that a man could only be said not to need them if he had no wants at all.

Foot argues that the virtues, like hands and eyes in the analogy, play so large a part in so many operations that it is implausible to suppose that a committal in a non-naturalist dimension is necessary to demonstrate their goodness.

Philosophers who have supposed that actual action was required if 'good' were to be used in a sincere evaluation have got into difficulties over weakness of will, and they should surely agree that enough has been done if we can show that any man has reason to aim at virtue and avoid vice. But is this impossibly difficult if we consider the kinds of things that count as virtue and vice? Consider, for instance, the cardinal virtues, prudence, temperance, courage and justice. Obviously any man needs prudence, but does he not also need to resist the temptation of pleasure when there is harm involved? And how could it be argued that he would never need to face what was fearful for the sake of some good? It is not obvious what someone would mean if he said that temperance or courage were not good qualities, and this not because of the 'praising' sense of these words, but because of the things that courage and temperance are.

=== Standard using and standard setting ===
As an offshoot of his fundamental criticism of Stevenson's magnetic influence thesis, Urmson wrote that ethical statements had two functions—"standard using", the application of accepted values to a particular case, and "standard setting", the act of proposing certain values as those that should be accepted—and that Stevenson confused them. According to Urmson, Stevenson's "I approve of this; do so as well" is a standard-setting statement, yet most moral statements are actually standard-using ones, so Stevenson's explanation of ethical sentences is unsatisfactory. Colin Wilks has responded that Stevenson's distinction between first-order and second-order statements resolves this problem: a person who says "Sharing is good" may be making a second-order statement like "Sharing is approved of by the community", the sort of standard-using statement which Urmson says is most typical of moral discourse. At the same time, their statement can be reduced to a first-order, standard-setting sentence: "I approve of whatever is approved of by the community; do so as well."

== See also ==
- Analytic philosophy
- Logical positivism
- Moral psychology
- Moral realism
- Prescriptivism (philosophy)
- Verification principle
