= Simon Blackburn =

English academic philosopher (born 1944)

Simon Blackburn FBA
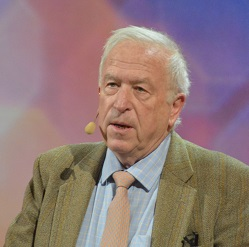
- Blackburn in 2017
- Born: Simon Walter Blackburn; 12 July 1944 (age 82); Chipping Sodbury, Gloucestershire, England

Education
- Education: Trinity College, Cambridge; Churchill College, Cambridge
- Doctoral advisor: Casimir Lewy

Philosophical work
- Era: Contemporary philosophy
- Region: Western philosophy
- School: Analytic philosophy
- Institutions: Trinity College, Cambridge; Pembroke College, Oxford; University of North Carolina at Chapel Hill; New College of the Humanities
- Doctoral students: E. J. Lowe; Michael A. Smith
- Main interests: Ethics; truth theory; philosophy of language
- Notable ideas: Quasi-realism

Simon Blackburn's voice
Recorded March 2011 from the BBC Radio 4 programme In Our Time

Simon Walter Blackburn (born 12 July 1944) is an English philosopher known for his work in metaethics, where he defends quasi-realism, and in the philosophy of language. More recently, he has gained a large general audience from his efforts to popularise philosophy. He has appeared in multiple episodes of the documentary series Closer to Truth. During his long career, he has taught at Oxford University, Cambridge University, and University of North Carolina, Chapel Hill.

== Life and career ==
Blackburn was born on 12 July 1944 in Chipping Sodbury, England. He attended Clifton College and went on to receive his bachelor's degree in philosophy in 1965 from Trinity College, Cambridge. He obtained his doctorate in 1969 from Churchill College, Cambridge.

He retired as the professor of philosophy at the University of Cambridge in 2011, but remains a distinguished research professor of philosophy at the University of North Carolina at Chapel Hill, teaching every fall semester. He is also a Fellow of Trinity College, Cambridge, and a member of the professoriate of New College of the Humanities. He was previously a Fellow of Pembroke College, Oxford and has also taught full-time at the University of North Carolina as an Edna J. Koury Professor. He is a former president of the Aristotelian Society, having served the 2009–2010 term. In 2004, he delivered the Gifford Lectures on Reason's Empire at the University of Glasgow. He was elected a Fellow of the British Academy in 2002 and a Foreign Honorary Fellow of the American Academy of Arts & Sciences in 2008.

He is a former editor of the journal Mind.

== Philosophical work ==
In philosophy, he is best known as the proponent of quasi-realism in meta-ethics and as a defender of neo-Humean views on a variety of topics. Richard Joyce, a proponent of Error Theory, says of Quasi-realism: "The quasi-realist is someone who endorses an anti-realist metaphysical stance but who seeks, through philosophical maneuvering, to earn the right for moral discourse to enjoy all the trappings of realist talk."

In 1994 The Oxford Dictionary of Philosophy, which was authored by Blackburn, was published.

In 2014 Blackburn published Mirror, Mirror: The Uses and Abuses of Self-Love, focusing on different philosophical aspects of self-love, discussing modern forms and manifestations of pride, amour-propre, integrity or self-esteem through various philosophical frameworks and ideas.

== Public philosophy ==
He makes occasional appearances in the British media, such as on BBC Radio 4's The Moral Maze.

He is a patron of Humanists UK (formerly the British Humanist Association), and when asked to define his atheism, he said he prefers the label infidel over atheist:

Being an infidel, that is, just having no faith, I do not have to prove anything. I have no faith in the Loch Ness Monster, but do not go about trying to prove that it does not exist, although there are certainly overwhelming arguments that it does not.

He was one of 55 public figures to sign an open letter published in The Guardian in September 2010, stating their opposition to Pope Benedict XVI's state visit to the UK, and has argued that "religionists" should have less influence in political affairs.

He was one of 240 academics to sign a letter to the Equality and Human Rights Commission opposing 'radical gender orthodoxy', published in The Sunday Times.

In a televised debate, Blackburn argued against the position of the author and podcaster Sam Harris that morality can be derived straightforwardly from science.

== Books ==
- Reason and Prediction (1973). ISBN 0-521-08742-2.
- Spreading the Word (1984) – an introduction to the philosophy of language and defence of quasi-realism. ISBN 0-19-824650-1.
- Essays in Quasi-realism (1993) – a collection of essays that defends quasi-realism. ISBN 0-19-508224-9.
- The Oxford Dictionary of Philosophy ([1994] 2015), 3rd ed. ISBN 0-19-211694-0.
- Ruling Passions (1998) – Blackburn's fullest and most detailed defence of quasi-realism. ISBN 0-19-824785-0.
- Truth (1999) (edited with Keith Simmons) – in the Oxford Readings in Philosophy series. ISBN 0-19-875250-4.
- Think: A Compelling Introduction to Philosophy. (1999) ISBN 0-19-210024-6 and ISBN 0-19-969087-1.
- Being Good (2001) – an introduction to ethics. ISBN 0-19-210052-1.
  - Reprinted as Ethics: A Very Short Introduction in Oxford University Press' Very Short Introductions series. ISBN 0-19-280442-1.
- Lust (2004) – one of an Oxford University Press series covering the Seven Deadly Sins. ISBN 0-19-516200-5.
- Truth: A Guide (2005). ISBN 0-19-516824-0.
- Plato's Republic: A Biography (2006) – from Atlantic Books' Books That Shook the World series. ISBN 1-84354-350-8.
- How to read Hume (2008) – Granta Publications. ISBN 978-1-84708-033-2.
- What do we really know?: The Big Questions of Philosophy – (2009) from Quercus. ISBN 978-1-78087-587-3.
- Ethics: A Very Short Introduction. Oxford: Oxford University Press. 2001. ISBN 978-0-19-280442-6.
- Mirror, Mirror: The Uses and Abuses of Self-Love (Princeton, NJ: Princeton University Press, 2014)
- On Truth (2018) ISBN 978-0190867218
