= Meta-rights =

In philosophy, meta-rights are the entitlements of individuals to their rights, including the possibility to waive, transfer or sell their rights.

== See also ==
- Ethical subjectivism
- Fact–value distinction
- Is–ought problem
- Meta-ethics
- Moral realism
- Normative ethics
