= Value pluralism =

Idea in ethics; many principles are true at the same time

In ethics value pluralism is the philosophical concept (or idea) that there are several fundamental values that may be equally correct and yet in conflict with each other. (Also known as ethical pluralism or moral pluralism, the phrase is sometimes hyphenated—especially to emphasize that the adjectival term "value" is not to be taken as a verb-form.)

In many cases, value-pluralism postulates that incompatible values may be incommensurable—in the sense that there is no objective ordering of them in terms of importance. Value pluralism is opposed to value monism, which states that all other forms of value can be mutually commensured or reduced to a single form.

Value-pluralism is a set of values in itself, and is a theory in metaethics rather than of normative ethics. Oxford philosopher and historian of ideas Isaiah Berlin is credited with being the first to popularize a substantial work describing the theory of objective value-pluralism, bringing it to the attention of academia (cf. the Isaiah Berlin Virtual Library). The related idea that fundamental values can and, in some cases, do conflict with each other is prominent in the political economy of Max Weber, who uses the term "polytheism" to describe contradictory yet rationalized immaterial tendencies, such as the state and the market.

== Context ==
Value-pluralism is an alternative to both moral relativism and moral absolutism (which Berlin called monism). An example of value-pluralism is the idea that the moral life of a nun is incompatible with that of a mother, yet there is no purely rational measure of which is preferable. Hence, values are a means to an end. Furthermore, moral decisions often take radical preferences because people’s needs differ. Moral decisions are made with varying rational calculuses that determine moral values attributed to the moral facts.

Value-pluralism differs from value-relativism in that pluralism accepts limits to differences, such as when vital human needs are violated. Political scientists have often referred to societies as being pluralistic on the basis of the existence of several competing value systems. Littunen says that such societies exhibit value pluralism.

If values can be compared with virtues or duties then reference might also be made to the arguments of classical philosophy. Kant, for example, referred to "a conflict of duties" and the subject can be traced back to Plato's Statesman where he wrote that although the aim may be "to promote not a part of virtue but the whole", it is often the case that the different parts of virtue "may be at war with one another".

== Adherents ==
Isaiah Berlin suggested that James Fitzjames Stephen, rather than himself, deserved credit for fathering value-pluralism. Stephen had observed:

"There are innumerable differences which obviously add to the interest of life, and without which it would be unendurably dull. Again, there are differences which can neither be left unsettled nor be settled without a struggle, and a real one, but in regard to which the struggle is rather between inconsistent forms of good than between good and evil. In cases of this sort no one need see an occasion for anything more than a good-tempered trial of strength and skill, except those narrow-minded fanatics whose minds are incapable of taking in more than one idea at a time, or of having a taste for more things than one, which one thing is generally a trifle. There is no surer mark of a poor, contemptible, cowardly character than the inability to conduct disputes of this sort with fairness, temper, humanity, goodwill to antagonists, and a determination to accept a fair defeat in good part and to make the best of it."

William James, influenced by Fitzjames Stephen, endorsed value-pluralism in an essay on "The Moral Philosopher and the Moral Life", which he first delivered as a lecture in 1891. He wrote that none "of the measures [of goodness] that have been actually proposed has, however, given general satisfaction ... The various ideals have no common character apart from the fact that they are ideals. No single abstract principle can be so used as to yield to the philosopher anything like a scientifically accurate and genuinely useful casuistic scale."

Joseph Raz and many others have done further work clarifying and defending value-pluralism. Social psychologist Philip E. Tetlock, studies and identifies with value pluralism.

Nietzsche could be seen as an advocate of value pluralism, because he wanted individuals to create their own values. By doing so they could become the übermensch. This means he believed that values created by individuals are equally valid as other values. Under this interpretation Nietzsche is not a moral objectivist, moral relativist, nor a moral nihilist.

== Political philosophy ==
Value pluralism is not the same as political pluralism, which argues that power should be distributed across multiple groups. However in political philosophy, value pluralism raises questions about how societies should respond to conflicts between equally valid but incompatible values.

Isaiah Berlin himself saw value pluralism as broadly compatible with liberalism, though never claiming that one necessarily led to the other. He argued that the persistence of genuine conflicts among values means that society should prioritise providing the liberty to choose those values and to allow for social variety. Unlike classical liberals he argued that liberty was one value among others rather than an absolute end in itself.

Berlin's intellectual biographer, political theorist John Gray, argues that liberalism regards itself as universally valid and so challenged by the existence of multiple, incompatible but genuine human goods. Instead, Gray presents liberalism as one value system among many rather than as the necessary outcome of reason or morality.

Political philosopher William Galston, former policy advisor to President Bill Clinton, has defended a Berlinian approach to value pluralism in books like Liberal Pluralism arguing that value pluralism is best served in a liberal values such as broad mindedness to work.

A notable critic of value-pluralism in politics is Ronald Dworkin, the second most-cited American legal scholar, who attempts to forge a liberal theory of equality from a monist starting-point, citing the failure of value-pluralism to adequately address the "Equality of what?" debate.

== Criticisms ==
The philosopher Charles Blattberg, who was Berlin's student, has advanced an important critique of Berlin's value-pluralism. Blattberg focuses on value-pluralism's applications to Marx, the Russian intelligentsia, Judaism, and Berlin's early political thought, as well as Berlin's conceptions of liberty, the Enlightenment versus the Counter-Enlightenment, and history.

Alan Brown suggests that Berlin ignores the fact that values are indeed commensurable as they can be compared by their varying contributions towards the human good. Regarding the ends of freedom, equality, efficiency, creativity, etc., Brown maintains that none of these are ends in themselves but are valued for their consequences. Brown concludes that Berlin has failed to show that the problem of conflicting values is insoluble in principle. The deliberative democrat Robert Talisse has published several articles criticizing the pluralism of Isaiah Berlin, William Galston, Richard Flathman, and John Gray, alleging informal logic and internal epistemological contradictions.

== See also ==
- Agonism – Political theory emphasizing the positive aspects of conflict
- Intellectual diversity – Political term
- Moral skepticism – Ethical theory
- Perspectivism – Philosophical principle that perspectives and epistemology are always linked
- Summum bonum – Latin expression meaning the highest or ultimate good
- Overton window – Range of ideas tolerated in public discourse
- The Right and the Good – 1930 book by W. D. Ross
- Reasonable doubt – Legal standard of proof
- Value system – Personal value, basis for ethical action
- Viewpoint discrimination – Discrimination based on point of view
