= Jonathan Dancy =

British philosopher (born 1946)

Jonathan Dancy FBA
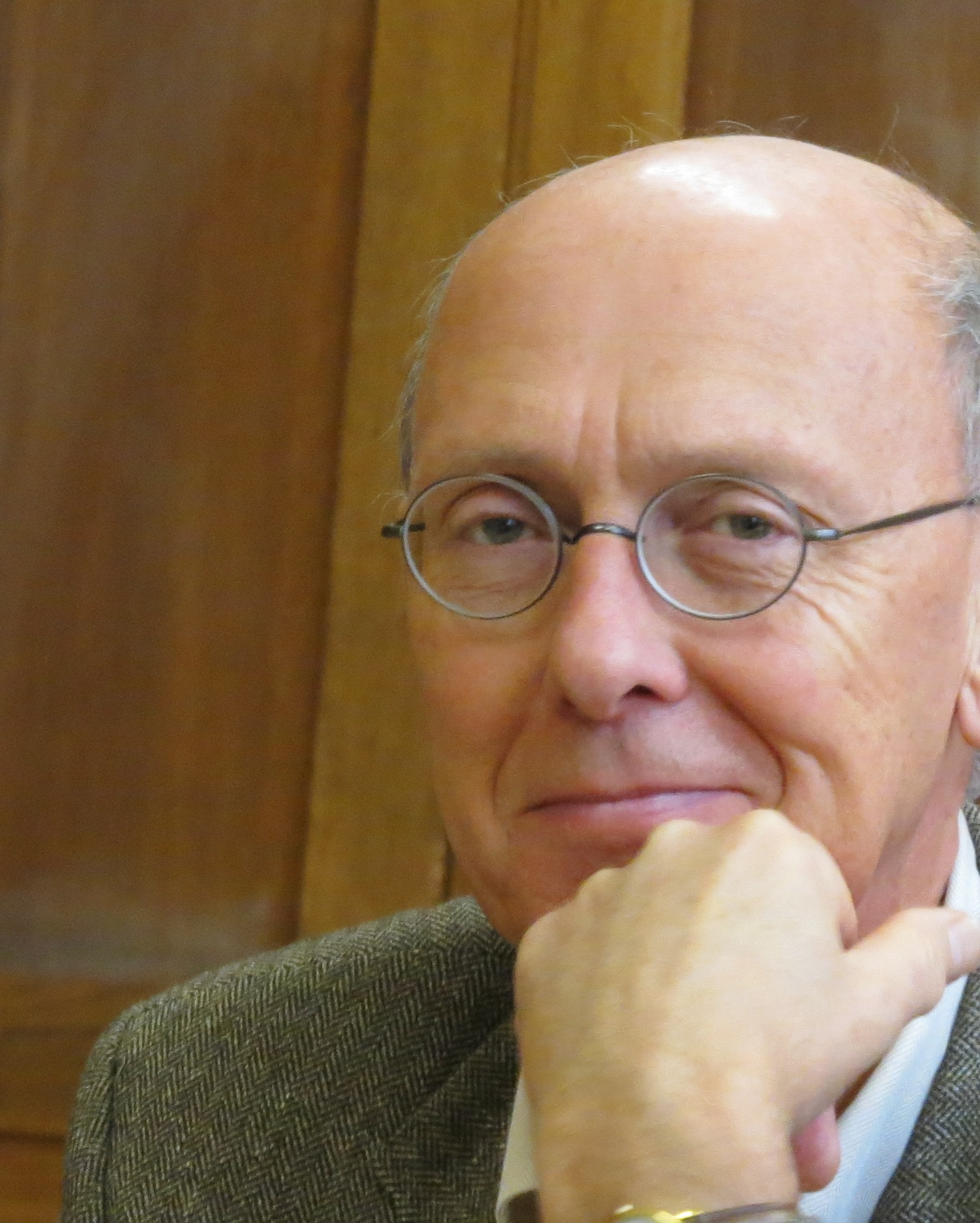
- Dancy in 2013
- Born: Jonathan Peter Dancy; 8 May 1946 (age 79)
- Spouse: Sarah Birley (m. 1973)
- Children: 3, including Hugh

Philosophical work
- Era: Contemporary philosophy
- Region: Western philosophy
- School: Analytic
- Main interests: Moral theory
- Notable ideas: Moral particularism

Jonathan Peter Dancy FBA (born 8 May 1946) is a British philosopher, who has written on ethics and epistemology. He is currently Professor of Philosophy at University of Texas at Austin and Research Professor at the University of Reading. He taught previously for many years at the University of Keele.

== Education and career ==
Dancy is the son of John Christopher Dancy. He was educated at Winchester College, where he was Head Boy and played cricket for the school, and Corpus Christi College, Oxford, where he obtained a double first in classics (1965–7: Classical Honour Moderations: First Class Honours; 1967–9: Literae Humaniores: First Class Honours, BA).

After graduating he served as a lecturer at Pembroke College, Oxford, for a year. In 1971 he became a lecturer at Keele University, becoming professor there in 1991.

After his daughter-in-law, American actress Claire Danes, mentioned him during an appearance on The Late Late Show with Craig Ferguson, Dancy appeared as a guest on the programme on 1 April 2010.

He was elected a Fellow of the British Academy in 2016.

== Philosophical work ==
After having worked on problems of epistemology, and more particularly on the nature of perception (argument from illusion), he emerged as the leading proponent in ethics of moral particularism, the idea that all moral reasons are particular and context-sensitive, rather than general.

Dancy also defends what he calls the holism of reasons, namely the idea that a consideration that is a reason for acting in a certain way in one case may not be a reason for acting in that way, or even a reason for not acting in that way, in other cases. In this sense, reasons are context-dependent. Dancy argues that the holism of reasons provides a major support for the main claim of his particularism, i.e., that there are no moral principles but that morality can get on perfectly well without them. Dancy edited some of George Berkeley's writings and dedicated a book to the Anglo-Irish thinker.

== Personal life ==
In 1973 he married Sarah Birley; they have three children: the actor Hugh Dancy; Jack Dancy, who runs a travel company; and Kate Redman, who works for UNESCO.

== Selected publications ==
=== Articles ===
- "On Moral Properties", Mind, 1981, XC, pp. 367–385.
- “Ethical Particularism and Morally Relevant Properties.” Mind, n.s.; 92, 368 (Oct., 1983): 530 – 547.
- “The Role of Imaginary Cases in Ethics.” Pacific Philosophical Quarterly, 66 (1985): 141 – 153.
- “An Ethic of Prima Facie Duties.” In A Companion to Ethics, ed. Peter Singer. Oxford: Blackwell Publishing, 1991. 219 – 229.
- “Can a Particularist Learn the Difference Between Right and Wrong?” In The Proceedings of the Twentieth World Congress of Philosophy, vol. 1, ed. K. Brinkmann. Bowling Green, OH: Philosophy Documentation Center, 1999. 59 – 72.
- Dancy, Jonathan (July 2000). "Intention and permissibility: Jonathan Dancy". Aristotelian Society, Supplementary Volume. 74 (1): 319–338. doi:10.1111/1467-8349.00074.

See also: Scanlon, T.M. (July 2000). "Intention and permissibility: T. M. Scanlon". Aristotelian Society, Supplementary Volume. 74 (1): 301–317. doi:10.1111/1467-8349.00073. Pdf.

- “The Particularist’s Progress.” In Moral Particularism, ed. Brad Hooker and Margaret Olivia Little. Oxford: Clarendon Press, 2000. 130 – 156.
- "Moral Particularism" in the Stanford Online Encyclopedia of Philosophy

=== Books (author) ===
- An Introduction to Contemporary Epistemology, Oxford: Blackwell, 1985.
- Berkeley: An Introduction, Oxford: Blackwell, 1987.
- Moral Reasons, Oxford: Blackwell Publishing, 1993.
- Practical Reality, Oxford: Oxford University Press, 2000.
- Ethics Without Principles. Oxford: Clarendon Press, 2004.
- Practical Shape. A Theory of Practical Reasoning, Oxford: Oxford University Press, 2018.

=== Books (editor) ===
- Perceptual Knowledge, Oxford: OUP, 1988.
- Reading Parfit, Oxford : Blackwell,1997.
- Normativity (Ratio conference 1998) Oxford : Blackwell, 2000.
- Philosophy of Action: An Anthology (with Constantine Sandis) Oxford : Wiley-Blackwell, 2015.
