= Impartiality =

Principle of justice holding that decisions should be based on objective criteria

Impartiality (also called evenhandedness or fair-mindedness) is a principle of justice holding that decisions should be based on objective criteria, rather than on the basis of bias, prejudice, or preferring the benefit to one person over another for improper reasons.

In philosophy, impartiality is usually treated as a formal property of choices: a choice is impartial when a certain kind of consideration, such as which particular people it benefits or harms, has no influence on it. Many moral theories, including utilitarianism, Kantian ethics and contractualism, treat an impartial point of view as the standpoint from which moral questions should be judged. Critics argue that strict impartiality leaves no room for the special concern people show for their family, friends and communities; this disagreement is known as the partialist–impartialist debate. Impartiality is also a legal standard for courts and public administration.

== Concept ==
Bernard Gert gave an influential definition: "A is impartial in respect R with regard to group G if and only if A's actions in respect R are not influenced at all by which member(s) of G benefit or are harmed by these actions." On this account impartiality is always relative to a respect and a group: an agent can be impartial in one respect or towards one group while being partial in others.

== In moral philosophy ==
=== The impartial point of view ===
David Hume held that moral judgments are made from a "common point of view" rather than from the speaker's own interests. Adam Smith, in The Theory of Moral Sentiments (1759), described moral judgment as viewing competing interests "from the place and with the eyes of a third person who has no particular connection with either, and who judges with impartiality between us", a figure he called the impartial spectator. Henry Sidgwick stated as self-evident that "the good of any one individual is of no more importance, from the point of view (if I may say so) of the Universe, than the good of any other".

Twentieth-century versions of the idea include the ideal observer theory. Roderick Firth defined moral terms by reference to the reactions of an observer who is fully informed, "disinterested" and "dispassionate". R. M. Hare modelled impartial moral thinking on an "archangel" with "superhuman powers of thought, superhuman knowledge and no human weaknesses".

=== Consequentialist impartiality ===
Consequentialist theories express impartiality by counting everyone's well-being equally when assessing outcomes. William Godwin gave a famous illustration in An Enquiry Concerning Political Justice (1793). If a fire forces a choice between saving the archbishop Fénelon, who will benefit many people, and a chambermaid, one should save Fénelon, and the answer does not change if the chambermaid is one's own mother or wife. "What magic is there", Godwin asked, "in the pronoun 'my' to overturn the decisions of everlasting truth?"

Because it gives no special weight to the agent's own interests, consequentialist impartiality can make heavy demands. Peter Singer argued in "Famine, Affluence, and Morality" (1972) that the affluent are obliged to give to famine relief until further giving would sacrifice something of comparable moral importance.

=== Deontological and contractualist impartiality ===
Kantian ethics locates impartiality in the requirement that one act only on maxims one could will as universal laws, and in equal respect for every person as an end in themselves. Contractualist theories build impartiality into the conditions of a hypothetical agreement. In A Theory of Justice (1971), John Rawls asked which principles of justice rational agents would choose in an "original position", behind a "veil of ignorance" that hides their own place in society, so that no one could shape the principles in their own favour. T. M. Scanlon's contractualism instead asks which principles no one could reasonably reject.

== Partiality and its defenders ==
Critics of impartialism argue that a morality requiring impartial motives misdescribes the value of personal relationships. Michael Stocker argued that a person who visits a friend in hospital only because it is their duty shows that modern ethical theories split reasons from motives, a split he called "schizophrenia". Bernard Williams considered a man who can save only one of two drowning people, one of them his wife. If he saves her only after reasoning that impartial morality permits it, Williams wrote, he has had "one thought too many". Susan Wolf argued that a life wholly devoted to impartial moral concern would not be an ideal human life. Other defenders of partiality include Lawrence Blum and John Cottingham, and care ethics, developed by Carol Gilligan and Nel Noddings, emphasizes attention to particular others over abstract impartial principles.

Impartialists have replied in several ways. Peter Railton argued that a "sophisticated" consequentialist need not think in consequentialist terms when acting, and can hold genuine personal commitments that are justified by their good effects. Brian Barry distinguished first-order impartiality, which governs individual choices, from second-order impartiality, which governs the choice of rules. On this view impartially chosen rules can permit or require partiality, as when parents are required to care for their own children. Brad Hooker's rule consequentialism takes a similar approach: an impartial foundational principle selects rules that "allow considerable scope for partiality".

== In law ==
European Union law refers in the Charter of Fundamental Rights of the European Union to:

- A right to good administration:

"Every person has the right to have his or her affairs handled impartially, fairly and within a reasonable time by the institutions, bodies, offices and agencies of the Union."

== See also ==
- Fairness (machine learning) – Measurement of algorithmic bias
- Justice – Concept of moral fairness and administration of the law
- Neutrality (philosophy) – Tendency not to side in a conflict
- Objectivity (philosophy) – Basic distinction in philosophy
- Procedural justice – Fairness in the processes that resolve disputes and allocate resources
- Sentencing disparity – Form of unequal treatment
