= Persian Weekly =

- Type: Weekly newspaper (Fridays)
- Format: Tabloid
- Owner(s): Golden Class Ltd.
- Editor-in-chief: Abbas Najafi Zarafshan
- Founded: June 29, 2007; 18 years ago
- Political alignment: None
- Language: Persian - English
- Headquarters: London
- Country: England
- Circulation: 3,000
- ISSN: 2042-213X
- Website: persianweekly.co.uk

Persian Weekly (Persian: هفته نامه پرشین) is the only non-political, non-religious, non-affiliate and impartial weekly newspaper to exclusively serve the vibrant Iranian (Persian) community in United Kingdom and abroad.

== History ==
Persian Weekly was first established and founded by Abbas Najafi Zarafshan in June 2007 for the purpose of serving the Persian community in London and United Kingdom.

== Editors ==
Abbas Najafi Zarafshan (2007–present)

== Features ==
Persian Weekly has a variety of sections including:

- Our Readers Views - Letters from readers.
- Births, Marriages & Deaths
- Entertainment - Includes events that are on in United Kingdom over the coming weeks.
- Classifieds - Advertising section for readers.
- Sport - Sport News.

== Online ==
In March 2010 Persian Weekly relaunched their website to be a lot more editorially focused, instead of a standard blog.
