= Panayot Butchvarov =

American philosopher (1933–2026)

Panayot Butchvarov (Bulgarian: Панайот Бъчваров; April 2, 1933 – May 1, 2026) was a Bulgarian-born American philosopher who was the Distinguished Professor Emeritus of Philosophy at the University of Iowa.

== Life and career ==
Butchvarov was born in Sofia, Bulgaria on April 2, 1933. He left Syracuse University in 1968 as a full professor to move to the University of Iowa, where he was at the time of his retirement in 2005 the University of Iowa Foundation Distinguished Professor of Philosophy. He was President of the American Philosophical Association (Central Division) in 1992–93, and has served as editor of the Journal of Philosophical Research.

He made major, systematic contributions to contemporary metaphysics, epistemology, and ethics. His books include Resemblance and Identity: An Examination of the Problem of Universals (Indiana University Press, 1966), The Concept of Knowledge (Northwestern University Press, 1970), Being Qua Being: A Theory of Identity, Existence and Predication (Indiana University Press, 1979), Skepticism in Ethics (Indiana University Press, 1989), Skepticism about the External World (Oxford University Press, 1998), and Anthropocentrism in Philosophy (de Gruyter, 2015).

In metaphysics, Butchvarov is perhaps best known for his work on the identity theory of universals and on the nature of informative identity statements (that is, statements of the form a=b—as opposed to instances of the law of identity, that is, statements of the form a=a). In epistemology, he argues for the view that knowledge is the absolute impossibility of mistake. In ethics, his central metaethical thesis is that a realist account of goodness is defensible if goodness is seen as a generic property.

Butchvarov may be said to have been influenced by philosophers as varied as Plato, Kant, Hegel, and Wittgenstein. The latter's influence can perhaps best be seen in Butchvarov's metaphilosophical Method of Analogy for which he argued in "The Limits of Ontological Analysis" (in M. S. Gram and E. D. Klemke (eds.), The Ontological Turn: Studies in the Philosophy of Gustav Bergmann (University of Iowa Press, 1974)). He claims that understanding is most often a matter of coming to see what something is like, seeing what it literally is being a limiting case, and that it is the noticing, discovery, and grasping of similarities and differences that is the core intellectual achievement in our understanding of the world.

In his most later work, Butchvarov argued that anthropocentrism in philosophy, though common, is deeply paradoxical. Ethics investigates the human good (including happiness and pleasure), epistemology investigates human knowledge (including perception and conceptualization), and antirealist metaphysics holds that the world depends on our cognitive capacities. But humans' good and knowledge, including their language and concepts, are empirical matters, properly investigated by empirical sciences, not armchair philosophy. And humans are inhabitants, not "makers," of the world. Nevertheless, all three – ethics, epistemology, and antirealist metaphysics – can be reinterpreted as making no reference to humans. Ethics would be confined to the metaphysics of the generic property goodness, epistemology to the appraisal of basic nonformal inferences, and antirealism to the logical structure of the world.

Butchvarov's later papers included "Commonsense Political Philosophy," "Counterfactuals and Antirealism," "Afterlife," and "Faith Without Theology,".

Butchvarov died on May 1, 2026, at the age of 93.

== See also ==
- American philosophy
- List of American philosophers

== Sources ==
- Larry Lee Blackman (ed.), The Philosophy of Panayot Butchvarov: A Collegial Evaluation (Edwin Mellon Press, 2005).
