= Constantine Sandis =

British philosopher

- Born: 1 October 1976 (age 50); New Delhi, India

Academic background
- Thesis: The Things that We Do and Why We Do Them (2005)
- Doctoral advisor: Jonathan Dancy
- Influences: Ludwig Wittgenstein, David Hume

Academic work
- Era: 21st-century philosophy
- Region: Western philosophy
- School or tradition: Analytic philosophy
- Institutions: University of Oxford, University of Hertfordshire, Oxford Brookes University
- Main interests: Philosophy of action, Moral psychology

Constantine Sandis FRSA (Greek: Κωνσταντίνος Σάνδης; born 1 October 1976) is a Greek and British philosopher. He works primarily on the philosophy of action, moral psychology, and the works of David Hume and Ludwig Wittgenstein.

Sandis is a Research Associate at the Uehiro Oxford Institute, University of Oxford, and a Visiting Professor of Philosophy at the University of Hertfordshire. He has previously held visiting fellowships at the Murphy Institute at Tulane University and the Centre de recherche en éthique, Montréal.

== Biography ==
Sandis read Philosophy and Theology at St Anne's College, Oxford. He received his Ph.D. from the University of Reading in 2005, supervised by Jonathan Dancy.

In 2005, he joined Oxford Brookes University, where he was appointed Professor of Philosophy in 2013. He later served as Professor of Philosophy at the University of Hertfordshire. Sandis is the series editor for Why Philosophy Matters, Anthem Studies in Wittgenstein, and Philosophers in Depth. He is a Fellow of the Royal Society of Arts and a Trustee of the Royal Institute of Philosophy.

== Research ==
Sandis' research focuses on the philosophy of action, specifically concerning reasons, moral psychology, and human understanding. His 2012 book, The Things We Do and Why We Do Them, argues for a pluralist account of action and its explanation. He defends the position that the reasons for which an agent acts are not always the causal explanations for why the action occurred.

He has written extensively on the view that understanding others requires a shared context and behavior rather than simply accessing 'mental contents'. In addition to his work on David Hume and Ludwig Wittgenstein, he has collaborated with Nassim Nicholas Taleb on the ethics of risk and tail events.

== Publications ==
Selected Books

- A Companion to the Philosophy of Action (ed. with Timothy O'Connor), Wiley-Blackwell, 2010.
- The Things We Do and Why We Do Them, Palgrave Macmillan, 2012.
- Reasons and Causes: Causalism and Anti-Causalism in the Philosophy of Action (ed. with Giuseppina D'Oro), Palgrave Macmillan, 2013.
- Philosophy of Action: An Anthology (ed. with Jonathan Dancy), Wiley-Blackwell, 2015.
- Character and Causation: Hume's Philosophy of Action, Routledge, 2019.
- From Action To Ethics: A Pluralistic Approach to Reasons and Responsibility, Bloomsbury, 2024.

Articles

- "Virtue Ethics and Particularism". Aristotelian Society Supplementary Volume. 44: 205–232. 2021. doi:10.1093/arisup/akab013. hdl:2299/24983.
- "The Skin In The Game Heuristic for Protection Against Tail Events (with Nassim N. Taleb)". Review of Behavioral Economics. 1 (1–2): 115–135. 2014. doi:10.1561/105.00000006.
- Sandis, Constantine (2012). "The Objects of Action Explanation". Ratio. 25 (3): 26–44. doi:10.1111/j.1467-9329.2012.00545.x.
