= Ethical subjectivism =

Philosophical position

Ethical subjectivism (also known as moral subjectivism and moral non-objectivism) is the meta-ethical view which claims that:

1. Ethical sentences express propositions.
2. Some such propositions are true.
3. The truth or falsity of such propositions is ineliminably dependent on the (actual or hypothetical) attitudes of people.

This makes ethical subjectivism a form of cognitivism (because ethical statements are the types of things that can be true or false). Ethical subjectivism stands in opposition to moral realism, which claims that moral propositions refer to objective facts, independent of human opinion; to error theory, which denies that any moral propositions are true in any sense; and to non-cognitivism, which denies that moral sentences express propositions at all.

== Relationship to moral anti-realism ==
Ethical subjectivism is a form of moral anti-realism that denies the "metaphysical thesis" of moral realism, (the claim that moral truths are ordinary facts about the world). Instead ethical subjectivism claims that moral truths are based on the mental states of individuals or groups of people. The moral realist is committed to some version of the following three statements:

1. The semantic thesis: Moral statements have meaning, they express propositions, or are the kind of things that can be true or false.
2. The alethic thesis: Some moral propositions are true.
3. The metaphysical thesis: The metaphysical status of moral facts is robust and ordinary, not importantly different from other facts about the world.

Moral anti-realism is the denial of at least one of these claims. Ethical subjectivists deny the third claim, instead arguing that moral facts are not metaphysically ordinary, but rather dependent on mental states, (individual's beliefs about what is right and wrong). Moral non-cognitivists deny the first claim, while error theorists deny the second claim.

There is some debate as to whether moral realism should continue to require the metaphysical thesis, and therefore if ethical subjectivists should be considered moral realists. Geoffrey Sayre-McCord argues that moral realism should not require mind-independence since there are morally relevant psychological facts which are necessarily mind-dependent, which would make ethical subjectivism a version of moral realism. This has led to a distinction being made between robust moral realism (which requires all three of the theses) and minimal moral realism (which requires only the first two, and is therefore compatible with ethical subjectivism).

== Moral relativism and ethical subjectivism ==
Moral relativism claims that statements are true or false based on who is saying them: they include indexicals in the same way that the truth of the statement "I am in Senegal" is dependent on who is making that statement. Depending on the variety of moral relativism, these statements may be indexed to a particular society (i.e., cultural relativism, when I say stealing is wrong, it is only true if stealing is not acceptable in my culture), or indexed to an individual (individualistic relativism). Furthermore, moral relativism is the view where an actor's moral codes are locally derived from their culture. The rules within moral codes are equal to each other and are only deemed "right" or "wrong" within their specific moral codes. Relativism is opposite to Universalism because there is not a single moral code for every agent to follow. Relativism differs from Nihilism because it validates every moral code that exists whereas nihilism does not. When it comes to relativism, Russian philosopher and writer, Fyodor Dostoevsky, coined the phrase "If God doesn't exist, everything is permissible". That phrase was his view of the consequences for rejecting theism as a basis of ethics. American anthropologist Ruth Benedict argued that there is no single objective morality and that moral codes necessarily vary by culture.

Ethical subjectivism is a completely distinct concept from moral relativism. Ethical subjectivism claims that the truth or falsehood of ethical claims is dependent on the mental states and attitudes of people, but these ethical truths may be universal (i.e. one person or group's mental states may determine what is right or wrong for everyone). The term "ethical subjectivism" covers two distinct theories in ethics. According to cognitive versions of ethical subjectivism, the truth of moral statements depends upon people's values, attitudes, feelings, or beliefs. Some forms of cognitivist ethical subjectivism can be counted as forms of realism, others are forms of anti-realism. David Hume is a foundational figure for cognitive ethical subjectivism. On a standard interpretation of his theory, a trait of character counts as a moral virtue when it evokes a sentiment of approbation in a sympathetic, informed, and rational human observer. Similarly, Roderick Firth's ideal observer theory held that right acts are those that an impartial, rational observer would approve of. William James, another ethical subjectivist, held that an end is good (to or for a person) just in the case it is desired by that person (see also ethical egoism). According to non-cognitive versions of ethical subjectivism, such as emotivism, prescriptivism, and expressivism, ethical statements cannot be true or false, at all: rather, they are expressions of personal feelings or commands. For example, on A. J. Ayer's emotivism, the statement, "Murder is wrong" is equivalent in meaning to the emotive, "Murder, Boo!"

While moral relativism and ethical subjectivism positions are often held together, they do not entail each other. For example, someone that claims that whatever their king wants to happen is the morally right thing for everyone to do would be an ethical subjectivist (right and wrong are based on mental states), but they would not be a moral relativist (right and wrong are the same for everyone). Conversely, a moral relativist could deny moral subjectivism if they thought that the morally right thing to do was to follow the written laws of your country (this morality is relativist since "the laws of your country" picks out different laws for different individuals, but not subjectivist since it is dependent on the written laws, which are not in anyone's head).

Some universalist forms of subjectivism include ideal observer theory (which claims that moral propositions are about what attitudes a hypothetical ideal observer would hold). Although divine command theory is considered by some to be a form of ethical subjectivism, defenders of the perspective that divine command theory is not a form of ethical subjectivism say this is based on a misunderstanding: that divine command proponents claim that moral propositions are about what attitudes God holds, but this understanding is deemed incorrect by some, such as Robert Adams who claims that divine command theory is concerned with whether a moral command is or isn't "contrary to the commands of (a loving) God".

== Terminology ==
There is some debate among philosophers around the use of the term "ethical subjectivism" as this term has historically referred to the more specific position that ethical statements are merely reports of one's own mental states (saying that killing is wrong just means you disapprove of killing). While this is an ethically subjective position (the truth of your statement does depend on your mental states), it is not the only one. Due to this ambiguity, some philosophers have advocated that the general position discussed here be referred to as non-objectivism.
