= Moral intelligence =

Capacity to understand right from wrong

Moral intelligence is the capacity to understand right from wrong and to behave based on the value that is believed to be right (similar to the notion of moral competence). Moral intelligence was first developed as a concept in 2005 by Doug Lennick and Fred Kiel. Much of the research involved with moral intelligence agrees that this characteristic is ability-based, rather than trait-based. Therefore, moral intelligence is seen as a skill that can be further developed with practice. Beheshtifar, Esmaeli, and Moghadam (2011) claim that moral intelligence is the "'central intelligence' for all humans." It is considered a distinct form of intelligence, independent to both emotional and cognitive intelligence.

== Models ==
There are two general 'models' of moral intelligence that are recurrent in the literature.

Doug Lennick and Fred Kiel, authors of Moral Intelligence and the originators of the term, identified four competencies of moral intelligence: integrity, responsibility, forgiveness, and compassion.

| Lennick & Kiel's competencies | Description |
|---|---|
| Integrity | Creating harmony between what we believe and how we act, doing what we know is right, always telling the truth |
| Responsibility | Taking personal responsibility, admitting mistakes and failures, embracing responsibility for serving others |
| Forgiveness | Letting go of one's own mistakes, letting go of others' mistakes |
| Compassion | Actively caring about others |

== Leadership ==
Moral intelligence is proposedly an important characteristic for leaders to have. Beheshtifar, Esmaeli, and Moghadam (2011) studied the effects of moral intelligence on leadership and identified that moral intelligence affects the overall performance of an organization because leaders who are morally intelligent are more committed, continuously learn from others around them, are more humble, and more willing to risk their own self-interests for the greater good of moral goals.

Beheshtifar and colleagues argue that moral intelligence provides a "great potential to improve our understanding of learning and behavior," and in particular within leadership roles. According to their research, moral intelligence is the driving force of our other forms of intelligences. Rahimi (2011) claims that humans are born with a natural moral instinct and that moral decisions are made rapidly and subconsciously. Beheshtifar and colleagues believe that within this moral instinct lies "inaccessible moral knowledge."

Beheshtifar, Esmaeli, and Moghadam (2011) reported that there is a significant amount of research to support that leadership effectiveness is positively correlated with intelligence. This means that more intelligent people are likely to be good leaders. However, the researchers suggest that smarter people are not always the best or most efficient leaders. They even go as far as to claim that other studies have found that "being much smarter than your subordinates can actually hinder effective leadership" due to the level of communication between the leaders and followers.

Although moral intelligence is often highly associated with the business world, Beheshtifar and colleagues agree that this form of intelligence does not lie solely in the field of business psychology.

== Education ==
Education has been said to be a "moral endeavor." The Association of Supervision and Curriculum Development (ASCD) stated during a panel on moral education that schools should define and teach universal moral values as part of the curriculum.

Rodney H. Clarken of the Northern Michigan University School of Education argued that moral intelligence must be taught to children by breaking it down into three different domains: cognitive, affective, and conative. The cognitive domain is used to understand and develop a sense of moral intelligence by teaching children right from wrong, practical application of virtues, and exercising moral problem solving. The affective domain is an approach to develop moral intelligence through sense of when a situation is a moral dilemma, knowing how to respond to a problem appropriately, and learning how to develop a set of values. Lastly, the conative domain includes setting goals, and taking action and persevering.
