= Moral relativism =

Philosophical positions

Moral relativism or ethical relativism (often reformulated as relativist ethics or relativist morality) is used to describe several philosophical positions concerned with the differences in moral judgments across different peoples and cultures. An advocate of such ideas is often referred to as a relativist.

Descriptive moral relativism holds that people do, in fact, disagree fundamentally about what is moral, without passing any evaluative or normative judgments about this disagreement. Meta-ethical moral relativism holds that the truth value of moral judgments is not universal and depends on the moral standards of individuals or groups. Normative moral relativism holds that everyone ought to tolerate the behavior of others even when large disagreements about morality exist. Though often intertwined, these are distinct positions. Each can be held independently of the others.

American philosopher Richard Rorty in particular has argued that the label of being a "relativist" has become warped and turned into a sort of pejorative. He has written specifically that thinkers labeled as such usually simply believe "that the grounds for choosing between such [philosophical] opinions is less algorithmic than had been thought", not that every single conceptual idea is as valid as any other. In this spirit, Rorty has lamented that "philosophers have... become increasingly isolated from the rest of culture."

Moral relativism has been debated for thousands of years across a variety of contexts during the history of civilization. Arguments of particular notability have been made in areas such as ancient Greece and historical India while discussions have continued to the present day. Besides the material created by philosophers, the concept has additionally attracted attention in diverse fields including art, religion, and science.

== Variations ==
=== Descriptive ===
Descriptive moral relativism is merely the positive or descriptive position that there exist, in fact, fundamental disagreements about the right course of action even when the same facts hold true and the same consequences seem likely to arise. It is the observation that different cultures have different moral standards.

Descriptive relativists do not necessarily advocate the tolerance of all behavior in light of such disagreement; that is to say, they are not necessarily normative relativists. Likewise, they do not necessarily make any commitments to the semantics, ontology, or epistemology of moral judgement; that is, not all descriptive relativists are meta-ethical relativists.

Descriptive relativism is a widespread position in academic fields such as anthropology and sociology, which simply admit that it is incorrect to assume that the same moral or ethical frameworks are always in play in all historical and cultural circumstances.

=== Meta-ethical ===
Meta-ethical moral relativists believe not only that people disagree about moral issues, but that terms such as "good", "bad", "right" and "wrong" do not stand subject to universal truth conditions at all; rather, they are relative to the traditions, convictions, or practices of an individual or a group of people. The American anthropologist William Graham Sumner was an influential advocate of this view. He argues in his 1906 work Folkways that what people consider right and wrong is shaped entirely—not primarily—by the traditions, customs, and practices of their culture. Moreover, since in his analysis of human understanding there cannot be any higher moral standard than that provided by the local morals of a culture, no trans-cultural judgement about the rightness or wrongness of a culture's morals could possibly be justified.

Meta-ethical relativists are, first, descriptive relativists: they believe that, given the same set of facts, some societies or individuals will have a fundamental disagreement about what a person ought to do or prefer (based on societal or individual norms). What's more, they argue that one cannot adjudicate these disagreements using any available independent standard of evaluation—any appeal to a relevant standard would always be merely personal or at best societal.

This view contrasts with moral universalism, which argues that, even though well-intentioned persons disagree, and some may even remain unpersuadable (e.g. someone who is closed-minded), there is still a meaningful sense in which an action could be more "moral" (morally preferable) than another; that is, they believe there are objective standards of evaluation that seem worth calling "moral facts"—regardless of whether they are universally accepted.

=== Normative ===
Normative moral relativists believe not only the meta-ethical thesis, but that it has normative implications on what we ought to do. Normative moral relativists argue that meta-ethical relativism implies that we ought to tolerate the behavior of others even when it runs counter to our personal or cultural moral standards. Most philosophers do not agree, partially because of the challenges of arriving at an "ought" from relativistic premises. Meta-ethical relativism seems to eliminate the normative relativist's ability to make prescriptive claims. In other words, normative relativism may find it difficult to make a statement like "we think it is moral to tolerate behaviour" without always adding "other people think intolerance of certain behaviours is moral". Some philosophers even argue that intolerance is, to some degree, important. As Russell Blackford puts it, "we need not adopt a quietism about moral traditions that cause hardship and suffering. Nor need we passively accept the moral norms of our own respective societies, to the extent that they are ineffective or counterproductive or simply unnecessary". That is, it is perfectly reasonable (and practical) for a person or group to defend their subjective values against others, even if there is no universal prescription or morality. We can also criticize other cultures for failing to pursue even their own goals effectively.

The moral relativists may also still try to make sense of non-universal statements like "in this country, it is wrong to do X" or even "to me, it is right to do Y".

Moral universalists argue further that their system often does justify tolerance, and that disagreement with moral systems does not always demand interference, and certainly not aggressive interference. For example, the utilitarian might call another society's practice 'ignorant' or 'less moral', but there would still be much debate about courses of action (e.g. whether to focus on providing better education, or technology, etc.).

== History ==
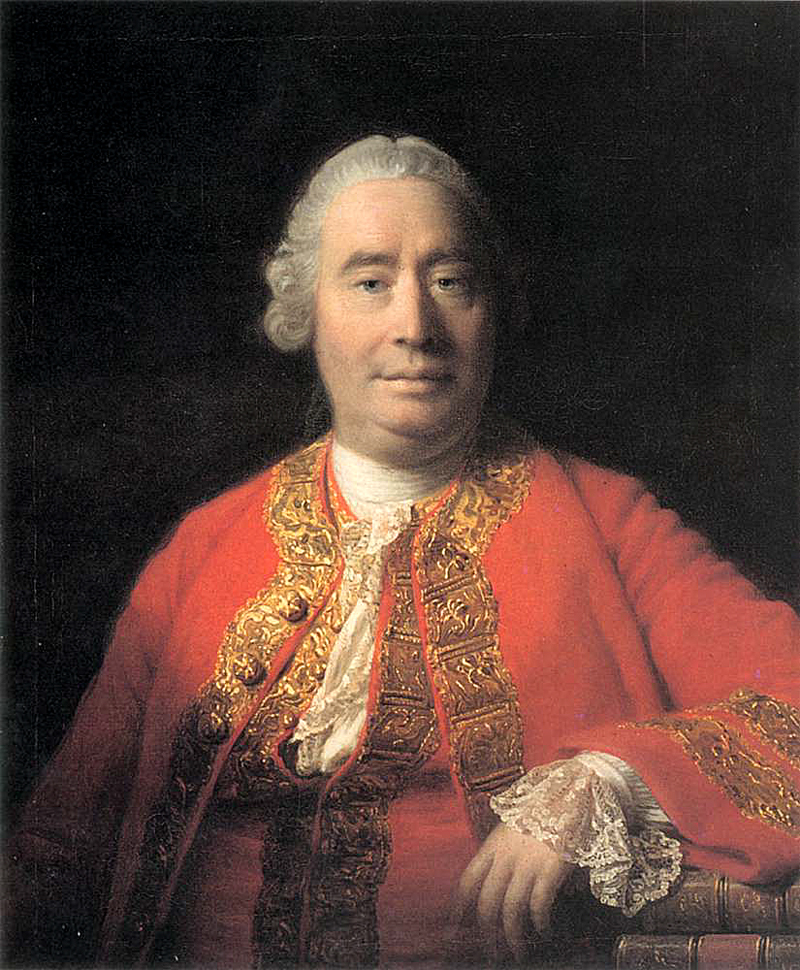
Scottish philosopher David Hume—his thinking was influential in the development of relativism.

Moral relativism encompasses views and arguments that people in various cultures have held over several thousand years. For example, the ancient Jaina Anekantavada principle of Mahavira (c. 599–527 BC) states that truth and reality are perceived differently from diverse points of view, and that no single point of view is the complete truth; and the Greek philosopher Protagoras (c. 481–420 BC) famously asserted that "man is the measure of all things". The Greek historian Herodotus (c. 484–420 BC) observed that each society regards its own belief system and way of doing things as better than all others. Sextus Empiricus and other ancient Pyrrhonist philosophers denied the existence of objective morality.

In the early modern era Baruch Spinoza (1632–1677) notably held that nothing is inherently good or evil. The 18th-century Enlightenment philosopher David Hume (1711–1776) serves in several important respects as the father both of modern emotivism and of moral relativism, though Hume himself did not espouse relativism. He distinguished between matters of fact and matters of value, and suggested that moral judgments consist of the latter, for they do not deal with verifiable facts obtained in the world, but only with our sentiments and passions. But Hume regarded some of our sentiments as universal. He famously denied that morality has any objective standard, and suggested that the universe remains indifferent to our preferences and our troubles.

Friedrich Nietzsche (1844–1900) believed that we have to assess the value of our values since values are relative to one's goals and one's self. He emphasized the need to analyze our moral values and how much impact they may have on us. The problem with morality, according to Nietzsche, is that those who were considered "good" were the powerful nobles who had more education, and considered themselves better than anyone below their rank. Thus, what is considered good is relative. A "good man" is not questioned on whether or not there is a "bad", such as temptations, lingering inside him and he is considered to be more important than a man who is considered "bad" who is considered useless to making the human race better because of the morals we have subjected ourselves to. But since what is considered good and bad is relative, the importance and value we place on them should also be relative. He proposed that morality itself could be a danger. Nietzsche believed that morals should be constructed actively, making them relative to who we are and what we, as individuals, consider to be true, equal, good and bad, etc. instead of reacting to moral laws made by a certain group of individuals in power.

One scholar, supporting an anti-realist interpretation, concludes that "Nietzsche's central argument for anti-realism about value is explanatory: moral facts don't figure in the 'best explanation' of experience, and so are not real constituents of the objective world. Moral values, in short, can be 'explained away.'"

It is certain that Nietzsche criticizes Plato's prioritization of transcendence as the Forms. The Platonist view holds that what is 'true', or most real, is something which is other-worldly while the (real) world of experience is like a mere 'shadow' of the Forms, most famously expressed in Plato's allegory of the cave. Nietzsche believes that this transcendence also had a parallel growth in Christianity, which prioritized life-denying moral qualities such as humility and obedience through the church. (See Beyond Good and Evil, On the Genealogy of Morals, The Twilight of the Idols, The Antichrist, etc.)

Anthropologists such as Ruth Benedict (1887–1948) have cautioned observers against ethnocentricism—using the standards of their own culture to evaluate their subjects of study. Benedict said that transcendent morals do not exist—only socially constructed customs do (see cultural relativism); and that in comparing customs, the anthropologist "insofar as he remains an anthropologist ... is bound to avoid any weighting of one in favor of the other". To some extent, the increasing body of knowledge of great differences in belief among societies caused both social scientists and philosophers to question whether any objective, absolute standards pertaining to values could exist. This led some to posit that differing systems have equal validity, with no standard for adjudicating among conflicting beliefs. The Finnish philosopher-anthropologist Edward Westermarck (1862–1939) ranks as one of the first to formulate a detailed theory of moral relativism. He portrayed all moral ideas as subjective judgments that reflect one's upbringing. He rejected G.E. Moore's (1873–1958) ethical intuitionism—in vogue during the early part of the 20th century, and which identified moral propositions as true or false, and known to us through a special faculty of intuition—because of the obvious differences in beliefs among societies, which he said provided evidence of the lack of any innate, intuitive power.

== Arguments for meta-ethical relativism ==
=== Scientific ===
==== Morality and evolution ====
Research within evolutionary biology, cognitive psychology, ethology, and evolutionary anthropology has claimed that morality is a natural phenomenon that was shaped by evolutionary mechanisms. In this case, morality is defined as the set of relative social practices that promote the survival and successful reproduction of the species, or even multiple cooperating species.

=== Literary ===
The literary perspectivism begins at the different versions of the Greek myths. Symbolism created multiple suggestions for a verse. Structuralism teaches us the polysemy of the poems.

Examples of relativistic literary works: Gogol's Dead Souls; The Alexandria Quartet by Lawrence Durrell; Raymond Queneau's Zazie dans le métro.

== Criticisms of meta-ethical relativism ==
=== Philosophical ===
==== R. M. Hare ====
Some philosophers, for example R. M. Hare (1919–2002), argue that moral propositions remain subject to human logical rules, notwithstanding the absence of any factual content, including those subject to cultural or religious standards or norms. Thus, for example, they contend that one cannot hold contradictory ethical judgments. This allows for moral discourse with shared standards, notwithstanding the descriptive properties or truth conditions of moral terms. They do not affirm or deny that moral facts exist, only that human logic applies to our moral assertions; consequently, they postulate an objective and preferred standard of moral justification, albeit in a very limited sense. Nevertheless, according to Hare, human logic shows the error of relativism in one very important sense (see Hare's Sorting out Ethics). Hare and other philosophers also point out that, aside from logical constraints, all systems treat certain moral terms alike in an evaluative sense. This parallels our treatment of other terms such as less or more, which meet with universal understanding and do not depend upon independent standards (for example, one can convert measurements). It applies to good and bad when used in their non-moral sense, too; for example, when we say, "this is a good wrench" or "this is a bad wheel". This evaluative property of certain terms also allows people of different beliefs to have meaningful discussions on moral questions, even though they may disagree about certain "facts".

==== Walter Terence Stace ====
"Ethical Relativity" is the topic of the first two chapters in The Concept of Morals, in which Walter Terence Stace argues against moral absolutism, but for moral universalism.

==== Philosophical poverty ====
Critics propose that moral relativism fails because it rejects basic premises of discussions on morality, or because it cannot arbitrate disagreement. Many critics, including Ibn Warraq and Eddie Tabash, have suggested that meta-ethical relativists essentially take themselves out of any discussion of normative morality, since they seem to be rejecting an assumption of such discussions: the premise that there are right and wrong answers that can be discovered through reason. Practically speaking, such critics will argue that meta-ethical relativism may amount to moral nihilism, or else incoherence.

These critics argue specifically that the moral relativists reduce the extent of their input in normative moral discussions to either rejecting the very having of the discussion, or else deeming both disagreeing parties to be correct. For instance, the moral relativist can only appeal to preference to object to the practice of murder or torture by individuals for hedonistic pleasure. This accusation that relativists reject widely held terms of discourse is similar to arguments used against other "discussion-stoppers" like some forms of solipsism or the rejection of induction.

Philosopher Simon Blackburn made a similar criticism, and explains that moral relativism fails as a moral system simply because it cannot arbitrate disagreements.

==== Other criticism ====
Some arguments come when people question which moral justifications or truths are said to be relative. Because people belong to many groups based on culture, race, religion, etc., it is difficult to claim that the values of the group have authority for the members. A part of meta-ethical relativism is identifying which group of people those truths are relative to. Another component is that many people belong to more than one group. The beliefs of the groups that a person belongs to may be fundamentally different, and so it is hard to decide which are relative and which win out. A person practicing meta-ethical relativism would not necessarily object to either view, but develop an opinion and argument.

=== Religious ===
According to theologian Joseph O'Leary: "Religious relativism is popular today, partly because of the repulsion and fear excited by its polar opposite, fundamentalism."

==== Roman Catholicism ====
Catholic and some secular intellectuals attribute the perceived post-war decadence of Europe to the displacement of absolute values by moral relativism. Pope Benedict XVI, Marcello Pera and others have argued that after about 1960, Europeans massively abandoned many traditional norms rooted in Christianity and replaced them with continuously evolving relative moral rules. In this view, sexual activity has become separated from procreation, which led to a decline in the importance of families and to depopulation. The most authoritative response to moral relativism from the Catholic perspective can be found in Veritatis Splendor, an encyclical by Pope John Paul II. Many of the main criticisms of moral relativism by the Catholic Church relate largely to modern controversies, such as elective abortion.

==== Buddhism ====
Bhikkhu Bodhi, an American Buddhist monk, has written:

By assigning value and spiritual ideals to private subjectivity, the materialistic world view ... threatens to undermine any secure objective foundation for morality. The result is the widespread moral degeneration that we witness today. To counter this tendency, mere moral exhortation is insufficient. If morality is to function as an efficient guide to conduct, it cannot be propounded as a self-justifying scheme but must be embedded in a more comprehensive spiritual system which grounds morality in a transpersonal order. Religion must affirm, in the clearest terms, that morality and ethical values are not mere decorative frills of personal opinion, not subjective superstructure, but intrinsic laws of the cosmos built into the heart of reality.

== Views commonly confused with moral relativism ==
=== Moral relativism vs ethical subjectivism ===
Moral relativism is a distinct position from ethical subjectivism (the view that the truth of ethical claims are not mind independent). While these views are often held together, they do not entail each other. For example, someone who claims "something is morally right for me to do because the people in my culture think it is right" is both a moral relativist (because what is right and wrong depends on who is doing it), and an ethical subjectivist (because what is right and wrong is determined by mental states, i.e. what people think is right and wrong).

However, someone who thinks that what is right and wrong is whatever a deity thinks is right or wrong would be a subjectivist (morality is based on mental states), but not a relativist (morality is the same for everyone). In contrast, someone who claims that to act ethically you must follow the laws of your country would be a relativist (morality is dependent on who you are), but not a subjectivist (morality is based on facts about the world, not mental states).

=== Moral relativism vs moral anti-realism ===
Depending on how a moral relativist position is constructed, it may or may not be independent of moral realism. Moral realists are committed to some version of the following three claims:

1. Semantic thesis: Moral statements have meaning, they express propositions, or are the kind of things that can be true or false.
2. Alethic thesis: Some moral propositions are true.
3. Metaphysical thesis: The metaphysical status of moral facts is robust and ordinary, not importantly different from other facts about the world.

While many moral relativists deny one or more of these claims, and therefore could be moral anti-realists, a denial is not required. A moral relativist who claims that you should act according to the laws in whatever country you are a citizen of, accepts all three claims: moral facts express propositions that can be true or false (you can see if a given action is against the law or not), some moral propositions are true (some actions abide by the laws in someone's country), and moral facts are ordinary (laws are not mental states, they are physical objects in the world). However, this view is a relativist one as it is dependent on the country you are a citizen of.

== See also ==
- Atheistic existentialism – Kind of existentialism
- Axiology – Systematic study of values
- Cultural relativism – Anthropological view
- De gustibus non est disputandum – Latin maxim that there is no accounting for taste
- Ethical egoism – View that people should only act in their own self-interest
- Ethical intuitionism – Family of views in moral epistemology
- Ethical subjectivism – Philosophical position
- Moral nihilism – Philosophical view that nothing is morally right or wrong
- Secular ethics – Branch of moral philosophy
- Situational ethics – Concept in ethics
- Is–ought problem – Philosophical problem articulated by David Hume

== Bibliography ==
- Guy Ankerl, Global Communication without Universal Civilization. vol I: Coexisting Contemporary Civilizations: Arabo-Muslim, Bharati, Chinese, and Western. (Geneva, INUPRESS, 2000. ISBN 2-88155-004-5)
- Joxe Azurmendi 1998: "The violence and the search for new values" in Euskal Herria krisian, (Elkar, 1999), pp. 11–116. ISBN 84-8331-572-6
- Kurt Baier, "Difficulties in the Emotive-Imperative Theory" in Paul W Taylor (editor): The Moral Judgement: Readings in Contemporary Meta-Ethics Englewood Cliffs, N.J.: Prentice-Hall, 1963
- Ruth Benedict, Patterns of Culture (mentor)
- Panayot Butchvarov, "Skepticism in Ethics" (Bloomington and Indianapolis, Indiana University Press, 1989).
- Ronald F. Duska, "What's the Point of a Business Ethics Course?", 1 Business Ethics Quarterly 335–352(1991), reprinted in Sterling Harwood, ed., Business as Ethical and Business as Usual (Belmont, CA: Wadsworth Publishing Co., 1996), pp. 11–21.
- R.M. Hare, Sorting out Ethics (Oxford University Press)
- Gilbert Harman & Judith Jarvis Thomson, Moral Relativism and Moral Objectivity (Blackwell Publishing), 1996.
- Sterling Harwood, "Taking Ethics Seriously -- Moral Relativism versus Moral Realism" in Sterling Harwood, ed., Business as Ethical and Business as Usual (Belmont, CA: Wadsworth Publishing Co., 1996), pp. 2–4.
- Sterling Harwood, "Against MacIntyre's Relativistic Communitarianism" in Sterling Harwood, ed., Business as Ethical and Business as Usual (Belmont, CA: Wadsworth Publishing Co., 1996), pp. 5–10.
- David Hume, An Enquiry Concerning the Principles of Morals, ed. Tom L. Beauchamp (Oxford University Press)
- Steven Lukes, Moral Relativism, Picador, 2008.
- G.E. Moore, Principia Ethica (Cambridge University Press)
- Jean-Paul Sartre, "Existentialism is a Humanism" in Existentialism From Dostoevsky to Sartre, ed. by Walter Kaufmann (World Publishing Company)
- Walter Terence Stace, The Concept of Morals, (The MacMillan Company, 1937, reprinted, 1975 by Permission of Macmillan Publishing Co., Inc., (Macmillan Publishers), ISBN 0-8446-2990-1), See Chapters 1 and 2 entitled "Ethical Relativity", pp 1–68.
- Leo Strauss, The Rebirth of Classical Political Rationalism, ed. Thomas L. Pangle (University of Chicago Press)
- Edward Westermarck, The Origin and Development of the Moral Ideas Macmillan, 1906.
- Bernard Williams, Ethics and the Limits of Philosophy (Harvard University Press)
- David B. Wong, Moral Relativity (Berkeley, CA: University of California Press, 1986), 248 pages.
- Paul Julian. Minimal Truth, Moral Conflict and Metaethical Relativism. 2006.
