= State consequentialism =

Mohist form of consequentialism

State consequentialism is a modern minority theoretical interpretation of Mohist consequentialist ethics in Sinology, often intersecting with Chinese Legalism. Sinologist Fraser of the Stanford Encyclopedia of Philosophy interprets Mohist consequentialism, dating back to the 5th century BC, as the "world's earliest form of consequentialism, a remarkably sophisticated version based on a plurality of intrinsic goods taken as constitutive of human welfare". An ancient Chinese State consequentialist might evaluate the moral worth of an action based on how it contributes to the basic goods of a more particular entity: a state, with social order, basic material wealth, and population growth valued by both Mohists and "Legalists" like Shang Yang. The term has also been applied to the political philosophy of the Confucian philosopher Xunzi.

Although some scholars have argued Mohist consequentialism as a type of state consequentialism, Mohism more generally holds that right and wrong are determined by what benefits all the people of the world. While some Mohists did serve in states, the Mohist ethical concern is generally to benefit all people, considered as an aggregate or a community, not just a particular political entity, such as the state.

Since there likely was no literal pre-Han Legalism category (the Han Feizi once indirectly uses it as a shorthand for Shang Yang's school), although some of the Han Feizi is critical of Mohism, as a major school and force in the Warring States period, Mohism is nonetheless relevant as one theoretical framework for interpreting the work. Considering peace beneficial and war harmful, Mohist participation in warfare was generally defensive, serving as military engineers; Shang Yang and the Han Feizi both advocate offensive warfare in the interest of the state. As one of State Consequentialism's more recent advocates, professor Tao Jiang attempts to reconcile it with more generalist Mohist consequentialism with the idea of the state coming to encompass "all under Heaven", making the human world and state identical and bringing warfare to an end.

== Consequentialism ==
It is the business of the benevolent man to seek to promote what is beneficial to the world and to eliminate what is harmful, and to provide a model for the world. What benefits he will carry out; what does not benefit men he will leave alone (Chinese: 仁之事者, 必务求于天下之利, 除天下之害, 将以为法乎天下. 利人乎, 即为; 不利人乎, 即止).

— Mozi, Mozi (5th century BC) (Chapter 8: Against Music Part I)

Unlike utilitarianism, which views pleasure as a moral good, "the basic goods in Mohist consequentialist thinking are... order, material wealth, and increase in population". During Mozi's era, war and famines were common, and population growth was seen as a moral necessity for a harmonious society. The "material wealth" of Mohist consequentialism refers to basic needs like shelter and clothing, and the "order" of Mohist consequentialism refers to Mozi's stance against warfare and violence, which he viewed as pointless and a threat to social stability.

Stanford Sinologist David Shepherd Nivison, in The Cambridge History of Ancient China, writes that the moral goods of Mohism "are interrelated: more basic wealth, then more reproduction; more people, then more production and wealth... if people have plenty, they would be good, filial, kind, and so on unproblematically". The Mohists believed that morality is based on "promoting the benefit of all under heaven and eliminating harm to all under heaven". In contrast to Bentham's views, state consequentialism is not utilitarian because it is not hedonistic or individualistic. The importance of outcomes that are good for the community outweigh the importance of individual pleasure and pain.

== Ivanhoe ==
Eirik Lang Harris of the Shenzi fragments (2017), Swiss Sinoloigst Henrique Schneider Han Fei's Political Philosophy, and Sinologist Tao Jiang (2021) reference Philip J. Ivanhoe (2000) as originating the theory of state consequentialism. This is not to say Harris is exclusively a state consequentialist interpreter; a paper of his on Shen Dao also prominently recalls A.C. Graham's Disputers of the Tao, with Graham being an older Legalist interpreter. Ivanhoe's theory of state consequentialism is as follows:

- The Mohists are "best described as materialist, state consequentialists. Like other consequentialists, one of the great strengths of their position is the clear criteria they offer for what is right and good. According to the Mohists, one should act in a way that maximizes the greatest amount of overall, material good for the state, with the good described in terms of the wealth, order, and population of the state."

This statement is preceded by two prior points:

- Mozi and his followers "had a rather thin picture of human nature and as a result a relatively simple view of moral psychology. Not unlike Socrates, they believed that people were highly rational creatures, and that a well-turned argument would have an inexorable pull on any person who could follow its course."
- The Mohists "also shared the widely held belief that people would respond in kind to the treatment they received and that most people had an innate tendency to defer to and try to please their superiors."

Henrique Schneider recalls a later 2011 quotation, requiring Han Fei be read from a pseudo-Daoist perspective in opposition to Confucian moral-self cultivation, but without Daoist moral self-cultiviation. This interpretation of the Han Feizi views Han Fei as subverting the power of the monarch on behalf of the state. Schneider considers his own interpretation to be Legalist, defining Legalism according to state consequentialism and Realism.

(Han Fei's monarch) is caught in the iron cage of his own state machinery and dwells there in mysterious isolation, what Hanfei calls a “godlike” (shen) isolation. Arguably, this is not an unanticipated or unwelcome consequence but the very aim of Hanfeizi’s political philosophy: a system in which the state and not the individual – not even the ruler – is supreme.

Sinologist Fraser of the Stanford Encyclopedia also discusses Mohist consequentialism, but Fraser's book later identifies his own interpretation of Mohist consequentialism as "Dao consequentialism", a standard interpretation of the Mohist ethic as aiming at universal benefit.

== Shen Dao ==
Eirik Harris a paper including a State Consequentialist interpretation of Shen Dao, from the mid Warring States period. While Shen Dao frames his arguments as being to the benefit of the king, Hu Shih still believed Shen Dao intends to benefit the people indirectly, by preventing favoritism and abuse. Harris takes Shen Dao's reasoning as based more simply in the consequences of actions for the state than a 'normative morality', as found in Confucian and later Daoist texts. One of Shen Dao's fragments says that the ruler's position was established to benefit the state, rather than the state to benefit the ruler.

Shen Dao does still seem to have some moral grounding, and does claim that an orderly state will benefit the people, assuming that a ruler might have such goals. However, Shen Dao never claims such goals as intrinsically valuable, or as the ruler's "fundamental aim", or that he should always take those actions which benefit state order or the people. The ruler simply 'ought' to follow Shen Dao's advice to do whatever benefits the state, namely to make it stronger, stable and well ordered, if he desires 'consequences' like a strong, orderly state and welfare. To better ensure its survival, as might be assumed.

Sinologist Hansen took Shen Dao as only beginning to emphasize a concept of the Dao or Way. Shen Dao claims to espouse a Dao or "Way" of Heaven. Despite this, his fragments do not focus on the concept to the extent of later texts. As a major concept, if it had been a more major focus for him, his archival commentators might have seen fit to include his discussion of the Way, at least to criticize it. The concept of an intrinsically moral Daoistic Dao or Way may not have been as developed in his time.

== Sources ==
- Hansen, Chad (1992). A Daoist Theory of Chinese Thought. Oxford: Oxford University Press. ISBN 978-0-19-535076-0.
- Hansen, Chad (2020). "Daoism". In Zalta, Edward N.; Nodelman, Uri (eds.). Stanford Encyclopedia of Philosophy (Fall 2020 ed.).
- Harris, Eirik Lang (2016). The Shenzi Fragments. New York: Columbia University Press. ISBN 9780231542166.
- Jiang, Tao (2021). Origins of Moral-political Philosophy in Early China. Oxford: Oxford University Press. ISBN 978-0-19-760347-5.
- Pines, Yuri (2024). Dao Companion to China's fa Tradition. Hebrew University of Jerusalem: Springer. ISBN 9789048129270.
- Schneider, Henrique (2018). An Introduction to Hanfei's Political Philosophy. Lady Stephenson Library, Newcastle upon Tyne: Cambridge Scholars Publishing. ISBN 978-1-5275-0812-5.
- Shih, Hu (2013). English Writings of Hu Shih. Volume 2. Princeton University: Foreign Language Teaching and Research Press. ISBN 978-3-642-31180-2.
