= Ideal observer theory =

Meta-ethical view

Ideal observer theory is the meta-ethical view which claims that ethical sentences express truth-apt propositions about the attitudes of a hypothetical ideal observer. In other words, ideal observer theory states that ethical judgments should be interpreted as statements about the reactions that a neutral and fully informed observer would have; "x is good" means "an ideal observer would approve of x".

The main idea [of the ideal observer theory] is that ethical terms should be defined after the pattern of the following example: "x is better than y" means "If anyone were, in respect of x and y, fully informed and vividly imaginative, impartial, in a calm frame of mind and otherwise normal, he would prefer x to y."

This makes ideal observer theory a subjectivist yet universalist form of cognitivism. Ideal observer theory stands in opposition to other forms of ethical subjectivism (e.g. moral relativism, and individualist ethical subjectivism), as well as to moral realism (which claims that moral propositions refer to objective facts, independent of anyone's attitudes or opinions), error theory (which denies that any moral propositions are true in any sense), and non-cognitivism (which denies that moral sentences express propositions at all).

Adam Smith and David Hume espoused versions of the ideal observer theory. Roderick Firth laid out a more sophisticated modern version. According to Firth, an ideal observer has the following specific characteristics: omniscience with respect to nonmoral facts, omnipercipience, disinterestedness, dispassionateness, consistency, and normalcy in all other respects. Notice that, by defining an Ideal Observer as omniscient with respect to nonmoral facts, Firth avoids circular logic that would arise from defining an ideal observer as omniscient in both nonmoral and moral facts. A complete knowledge of morality is not born of itself but is an emergent property of Firth's minimal requirements. There are also sensible restrictions to the trait of omniscience with respect to nonmoral facts. For instance, to make a moral judgment about a case of theft or murder on Earth it is not necessary to know about geological events in another solar system.

Those using the ideal observer theory do not usually assert that ideal observers actually exist. An analogous idea in law is the reasonable person criterion.
