= Normative ethics =

Branch of philosophical ethics that examines standards for morality

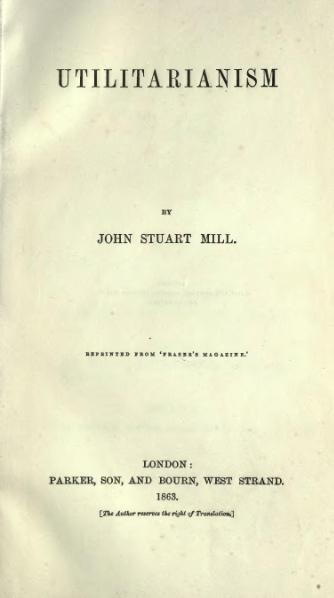
Cover of Utilitarianism by J. S. Mill.

Normative ethics is the branch of ethics that investigates questions regarding how one ought to act, in a moral sense.

Normative ethics is distinct from metaethics in that normative ethics examines standards for the rightness and wrongness of actions, whereas meta-ethics studies the meaning of moral language and the metaphysics of moral facts. Likewise, normative ethics is distinct from applied ethics in that normative ethics is more concerned with "what ought one be" rather than the ethics of a specific issue (e.g. if, or when, abortion is acceptable). Normative ethics is also distinct from descriptive ethics, as descriptive ethics is an empirical investigation of people's moral beliefs. In this context normative ethics is sometimes called prescriptive (as opposed to descriptive) ethics. However, on certain versions of the view of moral realism, moral facts are both descriptive and prescriptive at the same time.

Most traditional moral theories rest on principles that determine whether an action is right or wrong. Classical theories in this vein include utilitarianism, Kantian ethics, and some forms of contractarianism. These theories mainly offered the use of overarching moral principles to resolve difficult moral decisions.

== Normative ethical theories ==
There are disagreements about what precisely gives an action, rule, or disposition its ethical force. There are three competing views on how moral questions should be answered, along with hybrid positions that combine some elements of each: virtue ethics, deontological ethics, and consequentialism. Virtue ethics focuses on the character of those who are acting. In contrast, both deontological ethics and consequentialism focus on the status of the action, rule, or disposition itself, and come in various forms.

=== Virtue ethics ===
Virtue ethics, advocated by Aristotle with some aspects being supported by Saint Thomas Aquinas, focuses on the inherent character of a person rather than on specific actions. There has been a significant revival of virtue ethics since the 1950s, through the work of such philosophers as G. E. M. Anscombe, Philippa Foot, Alasdair MacIntyre, and Rosalind Hursthouse.

=== Deontological ethics ===
Deontology argues that decisions should be made considering the factors of one's duties and one's rights. Some deontological theories include:

- Immanuel Kant's categorical imperative, which roots morality in humanity's rational capacity and asserts certain inviolable moral laws.
- The contractualism of John Rawls, which holds that the moral acts are those that we would all agree to if we were unbiased, behind a "veil of ignorance".
- Natural rights theories, such as those of John Locke or Robert Nozick, which hold that human beings have absolute, natural rights.

=== Consequentialism ===
Consequentialism argues that the morality of an action is contingent on the action's outcome or result. Consequentialist theories, varying in what they consider to be valuable (i.e., axiology), include:

- Utilitarianism holds that an action is right if it leads to the most happiness for the greatest number of people. Prior to the coining of the term "consequentialism" by G. E. M. Anscombe in 1958 and the adoption of that term in the literature that followed, utilitarianism was the generic term for consequentialism, referring to all theories that promoted maximizing any form of utility, not just those that promoted maximizing happiness.
- State consequentialism, or Mohist consequentialism, holds that an action is right if it leads to state welfare, through order, material wealth, and population growth.
- Situational ethics emphasizes the particular context of an act when evaluating it ethically. Specifically, Christian forms of situational ethics hold that the correct action is the one that creates the most loving result, and that love should always be people's goal.
- Intellectualism dictates that the best action is the one that best fosters and promotes knowledge.
- Welfarism, which argues that the best action is the one that most increases economic well-being or welfare.
- Preference utilitarianism, which holds that the best action is the one that leads to the most overall preference satisfaction.

=== Other theories ===
- Social contract theories are a wide range of postulates concerning the voluntary and consensual pacts between two or more individuals or collectives, whose actions related to the following of the clauses of said contract posited while it was in force should be respected and obeyed.
- Ethics of care, or relational ethics, founded by feminist theorists, notably Carol Gilligan, argues that morality arises out of the experiences of empathy and compassion. It emphasizes the importance of interdependence and relationships in achieving ethical goals.
- Pragmatic ethics is difficult to classify fully within any of the four preceding conceptions. This view argues that moral correctness evolves similarly to other kinds of knowledge—socially over the course of many lifetimes—and that norms, principles, and moral criteria are likely to be improved as a result of inquiry. Charles Sanders Peirce, William James, and John Dewey are known as the founders of pragmatism; a more recent proponent of pragmatic ethics was James D. Wallace.
- Role ethics is based on the concept of family roles.

== Morality as a binding force ==
It can be unclear what it means to say that a person "ought to do X because it is moral, whether they like it or not." Morality is sometimes presumed to have some kind of special binding force on behaviour, though some philosophers believe that, used this way, the word "ought" seems to wrongly attribute magic powers to morality. For instance, G. E. M. Anscombe worries that "ought" has become "a word of mere mesmeric force".

If he is an amoral man he may deny that he has any reason to trouble his head over this or any other moral demand. Of course, he may be mistaken, and his life as well as others' lives may be most sadly spoiled by his selfishness. But this is not what is urged by those who think they can close the matter by an emphatic use of 'ought'. My argument is that they are relying on an illusion, as if trying to give the moral 'ought' a magic force.

— Philippa Foot

The British ethicist Philippa Foot elaborates that morality does not seem to have any special binding force, and she clarifies that people only behave morally when motivated by other factors. Foot says "People talk, for instance, about the 'binding force' of morality, but it is not clear what this means if not that we feel ourselves unable to escape." The idea is that, faced with an opportunity to steal a book because we can get away with it, moral obligation itself has no power to stop us unless we feel an obligation. Morality may therefore have no binding force beyond regular human motivations, and people must be motivated to behave morally. The question then arises: what role does reason play in motivating moral behaviour?

=== Motivating morality ===
The categorical imperative perspective suggests that proper reason always leads to particular moral behaviour. As mentioned above, Foot instead believes that humans are actually motivated by desires. Proper reason, on this view, allows humans to discover actions that get them what they want (i.e., hypothetical imperatives)—not necessarily actions that are moral.

Social structure and motivation can make morality binding in a sense, but only because it makes moral norms feel inescapable, according to Foot.

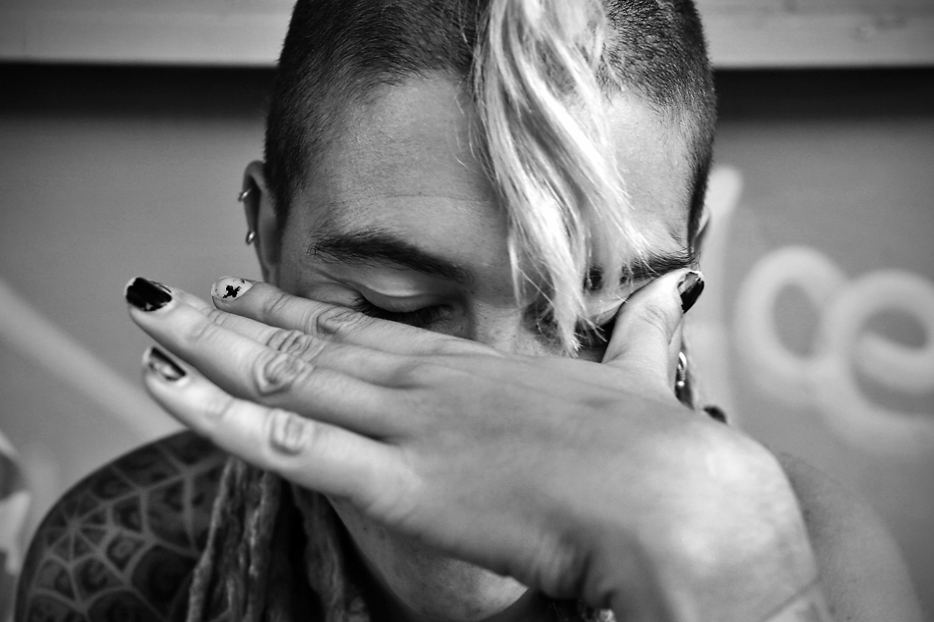
Feelings like shame and love are sometimes considered the only meaningful sense in which morality is binding. Absent those feelings, a person could behave "immorally" without remorse.

John Stuart Mill adds that external pressures, to please others for instance, also influence this felt binding force, which he calls human "conscience". Mill says that humans must first reason about what is moral, then try to bring the feelings of our conscience in line with our reason. At the same time, Mill says that a good moral system (in his case, utilitarianism) ultimately appeals to aspects of human nature—which, must themselves be nurtured during upbringing. Mill explains:

This firm foundation is that of the social feelings of mankind; the desire to be in unity with our fellow creatures, which is already a powerful principle in human nature, and happily one of those which tend to become stronger, even without express inculcation, from the influences of advancing civilisation.

Mill thus believes that it is important to appreciate that it is feelings that drive moral behavior, but also that they may not be present in some people (e.g. psychopaths). Mill goes on to describe factors that help ensure people develop a conscience and behave morally.

Popular texts such as Joseph Daleiden's The Science of Morality: The Individual, Community, and Future Generations (1998) describe how societies can use science to figure out how to make people more likely to be good.

== See also ==
- Axiological ethics
- Free will
- Norm (philosophy)
- Normativity
- Secular ethics
