= Metaethics =

Branch of ethics

In philosophy, metaethics (or meta-ethics) is the study of the nature, scope, ground, and meaning of moral judgment, ethical belief, or values. It is one of the three branches of ethics generally studied by philosophers, the others being normative ethics (questions of how one ought to be and act) and applied ethics (practical questions of right behavior in given, usually contentious, situations).

While normative ethics addresses such questions as "What should I do?", evaluating specific practices and principles of action, metaethics addresses questions about the nature of goodness, how one can discriminate good from evil, and what the proper account of moral knowledge is. Similar to accounts of knowledge generally, the threat of skepticism about the possibility of moral knowledge and cognitively meaningful moral propositions often motivates positive accounts in metaethics. Another distinction is often made between the nature of questions related to each: first-order (substantive) questions belong to the domain of normative ethics and applied ethics, whereas metaethics addresses second-order (formal) questions.

Some theorists argue that a metaphysical account of morality is necessary for the proper evaluation of actual moral theories and for making practical moral decisions; others reason from opposite premises and suggest that studying moral judgments about proper actions can guide us to a true account of the nature of morality.

== Metaethical questions ==
According to Richard Garner and Bernard Rosen, there are three kinds of metaethical questions:

1. What is the meaning of moral terms or judgments? (moral semantics)
  - Asks about the meanings of such words as 'good', 'bad', 'right', and 'wrong' (see value theory)
2. What is the nature of moral judgments? (moral ontology)
  - Asks questions of whether moral judgments are absolute or relative, of one kind or many kinds, etc.
3. How may moral judgments be supported or defended? (moral epistemology)
  - Asks such questions as how we can know if something is right or wrong, if at all.

Garner and Rosen say that answers to the three basic questions "are not unrelated, and sometimes an answer to one will strongly suggest, or perhaps even entail, an answer to another". A metaethical theory, unlike a normative ethical theory, does not attempt to evaluate specific choices as being better, worse, good, bad, or evil; although it may have profound implications as to the validity and meaning of normative ethical claims. An answer to any of the three example questions above would not itself be a normative ethical statement.

== Moral semantics ==
Moral semantics attempts to answer the question, "What is the meaning of moral terms or judgments?" Answers may have implications for answers to the other two questions as well.

=== Cognitivist theories ===
Cognitivist theories hold that evaluative moral sentences express propositions (i.e., they are 'truth-apt' or 'truth bearers', capable of being true or false), as opposed to non-cognitivism. Most forms of cognitivism hold that some such propositions are true (including moral realism and ethical subjectivism), as opposed to error theory, which asserts that all are erroneous.

==== Moral realism ====
Moral realism (in the robust sense; see moral universalism for the minimalist sense) holds that such propositions are about robust or mind-independent facts, that is, not facts about any person or group's subjective opinion, but about objective features of the world. Metaethical theories are commonly categorized as either a form of realism or as one of three forms of "anti-realism" regarding moral facts: ethical subjectivism, error theory, or non-cognitivism. Realism comes in two main varieties:

1. Ethical naturalism holds that there are objective moral properties and that these properties are reducible or stand in some metaphysical relation (such as supervenience) to entirely non-ethical properties. Most ethical naturalists hold that we have empirical knowledge of moral truths. Ethical naturalism was implicitly assumed by many modern ethical theorists, particularly utilitarians.
2. Ethical non-naturalism, as put forward by G. E. Moore, holds that there are objective and irreducible moral properties (such as the property of 'goodness'), and that we sometimes have intuitive or otherwise a priori awareness of moral properties or of moral truths. Moore's open question argument against what he considered the naturalistic fallacy was largely responsible for the birth of metaethical research in contemporary analytic philosophy.

==== Ethical subjectivism ====
Ethical subjectivism is one form of moral anti-realism. It holds that moral statements are made true or false by the attitudes and/or conventions of people, either those of each society, those of each individual, or those of some particular individual. Most forms of ethical subjectivism are relativist, but there are notable forms that are universalist:

- Ideal observer theory holds that what is right is determined by the attitudes that a hypothetical ideal observer would have. An ideal observer is usually characterized as a being who is perfectly rational, imaginative, and informed, among other things. Though a subjectivist theory due to its reference to a particular (albeit hypothetical) subject, Ideal Observer Theory still purports to provide universal answers to moral questions.
- Divine command theory holds that for a thing to be right is for a unique being, God, to approve of it, and that what is right for non-God beings is obedience to the divine will. This view was criticized by Plato in the Euthyphro (see the Euthyphro problem) but retains some modern defenders (Robert Adams, Philip Quinn, and others). Like ideal observer theory, divine command theory purports to be universalist despite its subjectivism.

==== Error theory ====
Error theory, another form of moral anti-realism, holds that although ethical claims do express propositions, all such propositions are false, as the properties discussed don't exist (moral goodness, virtue, evil, etc). Thus, both the statement "Murder is morally wrong" and the statement "Murder is morally permissible" are false, according to error theory. J. L. Mackie is the best-known proponent of this view. Since error theory denies that there are moral truths, error theory entails moral nihilism and, thus, moral skepticism; however, neither moral nihilism nor moral skepticism conversely entail error theory.

==== Non-realist cognitivism ====
Non-realist cognitivism (or non-metaphysical non-cognitivism) is a form of cognitivism that holds that (i) moral propositions are irreducibly normative truth-apt beliefs, (ii) some moral propositions are true, and (iii) no moral proposition is "made true by describing, or corresponding to, how things are in some part of reality". Non-realist cognivism's proponents, such as Derek Parfit, maintain it is different from non-naturalist realism in making no ontological commitment to moral entities. Parfit claims normative truths are not made true by anything that exists "either as natural properties in the spatio-temporal world, or in some non-spatio-temporal realm". Consequently, normative truths would not be contingent on a truthmaker. This contradicts Truthmaker Maximalism, the truthmaker theory that all truths must have one. Parfit explains this by claiming necessity, mathematical, and logical claims are also true in this way, stating:

If we are Non-Realist Cognitivists, we deny that [...] logical and modal claims are made to be true by there being some part of reality which these claims correctly describe, or to which they correspond. If there is any dependence here, this dependence would go the other way. It would be reality that must correspond to these truths. Not even an omnipotent God could have made it false that two plus two equals four.

Farbod Akhlaghi, Evan Jack and Mustafa Khuramy, and others call truths that also do not have truthmakers "partners in innocence". Akhlaghi believes a successful partner-in-innocence would show both that (1) Truthmaking Maximalism is false and (2) normative truths are not made true, if and only if both: (i) the successful partner-in-innocence lacks a truthmaker and (ii) "the best explanation for why they lack truthmakers show that there is no relevant disanalogy with normative propositions that prevents NRC from appealing to them." While Akhlaghi grants (i) for logical truths, analytic truths, negative-existential truths and past/future truths, and modal / metaphysically necessary truths, he thinks none meets (ii) and therefore none is a successful partner-in-innocence.

Akhlagi claims logical truths do not meet (ii) because the best explanation for why truths about the property of validity—such as the truth that "<modus ponens is valid>"—lack any truthmaker is "the prima facie plausible thought that the property of validity is reducible to something like the relations amongst the contents of the propositions in some argument." Akhlaghi contends non-realist cognitivism denies any such reduction for normative truths, as denying any such reduction is part of why non-realist cognitivism is a form of non-naturalism about normativity and not denying any such reduction would collapse non-realist cognitivism into a form of reductive naturalism about normativity.

Akhlaghi and others believe that non-realist cognitivism is an attractive theory because: (1.) it offers an alternative to traditional non-naturalism by avoiding metaphysical objections against it that many take to be decisive; (2.) it offers an alternative to Simon Blackburn and Allan Gibbard's Quasi-Realism, which many have rejected due to its non-cognitivism; (3.) if successful, it would reveal entirely misguided the strong motivation for naturalism and error theories: non-naturalism's seeming incompatibility with naturalism about reality more generally.

=== Non-cognitivist theories ===
Non-cognitivist theories hold that ethical sentences are neither true nor false because they do not express genuine propositions. Non-cognitivism is another form of moral anti-realism. Most forms of non-cognitivism are also forms of expressivism, however some such as Mark Timmons and Terrence Horgan distinguish the two and allow the possibility of cognitivist forms of expressivism. Non-cognitivism includes:

- Emotivism, defended by A. J. Ayer and Charles Stevenson, holds that ethical sentences serve merely to express emotions. Ayer argues that ethical sentences are expressions of approval or disapproval, not assertions. So "Killing is wrong" means something like "Boo on killing!".
- Quasi-realism, defended by Simon Blackburn, holds that ethical statements behave linguistically like factual claims and can be appropriately called "true" or "false", even though there are no ethical facts for them to correspond to. Projectivism and moral fictionalism are related theories.
- Universal prescriptivism, defended by R. M. Hare, holds that moral statements function like universalized imperative sentences. So "Killing is wrong" means something like "Don't kill!" Hare's version of prescriptivism requires that moral prescriptions be universalizable, and hence actually have objective values, in spite of failing to be indicative statements with truth-values per se.

=== Centralism and non-centralism ===
Yet another way of categorizing metaethical theories is to distinguish between centralist and non-centralist moral theories. The debate between centralism and non-centralism revolves around the relationship between the so-called "thin" and "thick" concepts of morality: thin moral concepts are those such as good, bad, right, and wrong; thick moral concepts are those such as courageous, inequitable, just, or dishonest. While both sides agree that the thin concepts are more general and the thick more specific, centralists hold that the thin concepts are antecedent to the thick ones and that the latter are therefore dependent on the former. That is, centralists argue that one must understand words like "right" and "ought" before understanding words like "just" and "unkind". Non-centralism rejects this view, holding that thin and thick concepts are on par with one another and even that the thick concepts are a sufficient starting point for understanding the thin ones.

Non-centralism has been of particular importance to ethical naturalists in the late 20th and early 21st centuries as part of their argument that normativity is a non-excisable aspect of language and that there is no way of analyzing thick moral concepts into a purely descriptive element attached to a thin moral evaluation, thus undermining any fundamental division between facts and norms. Allan Gibbard, R. M. Hare, and Simon Blackburn have argued in favor of the fact/norm distinction, meanwhile, with Gibbard going so far as to argue that, even if conventional English has only mixed normative terms (that is, terms that are neither purely descriptive nor purely normative), we could develop a nominally English metalanguage that still allowed us to maintain the division between factual descriptions and normative evaluations.

== Moral ontology ==
Moral ontology attempts to answer the question, "What is the nature of moral judgments?"

Amongst those who believe there to be some standard(s) of morality (as opposed to moral nihilists), there are two divisions:

1. universalists, who hold that the same moral facts or principles apply to everyone everywhere; and
2. relativists, who hold that different moral facts or principles apply to different people or societies.

=== Moral universalism ===
Moral universalism (or universal morality) is the metaethical position that some system of ethics, or a universal ethic, applies universally, that is to all intelligent beings regardless of culture, race, sex, religion, nationality, sexuality, or other distinguishing feature. The source or justification of this system may be thought to be, for instance, human nature, shared vulnerability to suffering, the demands of universal reason, what is common among existing moral codes, or the common mandates of religion (although it can be argued that the latter is not in fact moral universalism because it may distinguish between Gods and mortals). Moral universalism is the opposing position to various forms of moral relativism.

Universalist theories are generally forms of moral realism, though exceptions exist, such as the subjectivist ideal observer and divine command theories, and the non-cognitivist universal prescriptivism of R. M. Hare. Forms of moral universalism include:

- Value monism is the common form of universalism, which holds that all goods are commensurable on a single value scale.
- Value pluralism contends that there are two or more genuine scales of value, knowable as such, yet incommensurable, so that any prioritization of these values is either non-cognitive or subjective. A value pluralist might, for example, contend that both a life as a nun and a life as a mother realize genuine values (in a universalist sense), yet they are incompatible (nuns may not have children), and there is no purely rational way to measure which is preferable. A notable proponent of this view is Isaiah Berlin.

=== Moral relativism ===
Metaethical moral relativism maintains that all moral judgments have their origins either in the moral standards of individuals (ethical subjectivism) or groups of people, and that no single standard exists by which one can objectively assess the truth of a moral proposition. It is different from descriptive moral relativism, which states that as a matter of fact, there are widespread moral disagreements across societies. Metaethical relativists, in general, believe that judgments about what is "right" or "wrong" cannot be universally true and are relative to a group's traditions, convictions, or practices. They argue that even based on the same set of verifiable facts, some societies or individuals will have a fundamental disagreement about what one ought to do based on societal or individual norms, and one cannot adjudicate these using some independent standard of evaluation. Metaethical moral relativism faces the challenge of defining which groups and which moral standards have the authority to determine whether moral judgments are true.

=== Moral nihilism ===
Moral nihilism, also known as ethical nihilism, is the metaethical view that nothing has intrinsic moral value. For example, a moral nihilist would say that killing someone, for whatever reason, is intrinsically neither morally right nor morally wrong. Moral nihilism must be distinguished from moral relativism, which does allow for moral statements to be intrinsically true or false in a non-universal sense, but does not assign any static truth-values to moral statements. Insofar as only true statements can be known, moral nihilists are moral skeptics. Most forms of moral nihilism are non-cognitivist and vice versa, though there are notable exceptions such as universal prescriptivism (which is semantically non-cognitive but substantially universal).

== Moral epistemology ==
Moral epistemology is the study of moral knowledge. It attempts to answer such questions as, "How may moral judgments be supported or defended?" and "Is moral knowledge possible?"

If one presupposes a cognitivist interpretation of moral sentences, morality is justified by the moralist's knowledge of moral facts, and the theories to justify moral judgements are epistemological theories. Most moral epistemologies posit that moral knowledge is somehow possible (including empiricism and moral rationalism), as opposed to moral skepticism. Amongst them, there are those who hold that moral knowledge is gained inferentially on the basis of some sort of non-moral epistemic process, as opposed to ethical intuitionism.

=== Moral knowledge gained by inference ===
==== Empiricism ====
Empiricism is the doctrine that knowledge is gained primarily through observation and experience. Metaethical theories that imply an empirical epistemology include:

- ethical naturalism, which holds moral facts to be reducible to non-moral facts and thus knowable in the same ways; and
- most common forms of ethical subjectivism, which hold that moral facts reduce to facts about individual opinions or cultural conventions and thus are knowable by observation of those conventions.

There are exceptions within subjectivism however, such as ideal observer theory, which implies that moral facts may be known through a rational process, and individualist ethical subjectivism, which holds that moral facts are merely personal opinions and so may be known only through introspection. Empirical arguments for ethics run into the is-ought problem, which asserts that the way the world is cannot alone instruct people how they ought to act.

==== Moral rationalism ====
Moral rationalism, also called ethical rationalism, is the view according to which moral truths (or at least general moral principles) are knowable a priori, by reason alone. Plato and Immanuel Kant, prominent figures in the history of philosophy, defended moral rationalism. David Hume and Friedrich Nietzsche are two figures in the history of philosophy who have rejected moral rationalism.

Recent philosophers who defended moral rationalism include R. M. Hare, Christine Korsgaard, Alan Gewirth, and Michael Smith. A moral rationalist may adhere to any number of different semantic theories as well; moral realism is compatible with rationalism, and the subjectivist ideal observer theory and non-cognitivist universal prescriptivism both entail it.

=== Ethical intuitionism ===
Ethical intuitionism is the view according to which some moral truths can be known without inference. That is, the view is at its core a foundationalism about moral beliefs. Such an epistemological view implies that there are moral beliefs with propositional contents; so it implies cognitivism. Ethical intuitionism commonly suggests moral realism, the view that there are objective facts of morality and, to be more specific, ethical non-naturalism, the view that these evaluative facts cannot be reduced to natural fact. However, neither moral realism nor ethical non-naturalism are essential to the view; most ethical intuitionists simply happen to hold those views as well. Ethical intuitionism comes in both a "rationalist" variety, and a more "empiricist" variety known as moral sense theory.

=== Moral skepticism ===
Moral skepticism is the class of metaethical theories all members of which entail that no one has any moral knowledge. Many moral skeptics also make the stronger, modal, claim that moral knowledge is impossible. Forms of moral skepticism include, but are not limited to, error theory and most but not all forms of non-cognitivism.

== See also ==
- Anthropic principle
- Axiology
- Deontic logic
- Ethical subjectivism
- Fact–value distinction
- Is–ought problem
- Meta-rights
- Moral realism
- Normative ethics
- Principia Ethica
- The Right and the Good
