= Roderick Firth =

American philosopher

Roderick Firth (January 30, 1917 – December 22, 1987) was an American philosopher. He was Professor of Philosophy at Harvard University from 1953 until his death. He was born in Orange, New Jersey and died in Arlington, Massachusetts.

== Education ==
Firth earned his Ph.D. in philosophy from Harvard in 1943. His thesis, supervised by C. I. Lewis, was entitled Sense-Data and the Principle of Reduction.

== Career ==
He taught at Brown University before joining the Harvard faculty in 1953.

Firth is noted for his defense of the ideal observer theory in ethics and for his exploration of radical empiricism. Firth also defended a form of semantic holism which he referred to as a "coherence theory of concepts" distinct from both the coherence theory of truth and coherence theory of justification. Firth debated his views on the nature of concept formation and epistemic privilege with Wilfrid Sellars against whom he defended the views of C. I. Lewis.

== See also ==
- Phenomenalism
