= Outline of ethics =

Overview of and topical guide to ethics

The following outline is provided as an overview of and topical guide to ethics.

Ethics (also known as moral philosophy) is the branch of philosophy that involves systematizing, defending, and recommending concepts of right and wrong conduct. The field of ethics, along with aesthetics, concern matters of value, and thus comprise the branch of philosophy called axiology.

== Branches ==
The following examples of questions that might be considered in each field illustrate the differences between the fields:

- Descriptive ethics: What do people think is right?
- Normative ethics (prescriptive): How should people act?
- Applied ethics: How do we take moral knowledge and put it into practice?
- Metaethics: What does "right" even mean?

=== Applied ethics ===
Applied ethics – Using philosophical methods, attempts to identify the morally correct course of action in various fields of human life.

- Economics and business
  - Business ethics – Concerns questions such as the limits on managers in the pursuit of profit, or the duty of 'whistleblowers' to the general public as opposed to their employers
  - Development ethics (economic development)
  - Ethics in management – Application of ethical principles to the area of business activities
  - Ethics in pharmaceutical sales
  - Lifeboat ethics – Metaphor for resource distribution proposed by Garrett Hardin
- Bioethics – concerned with identifying the correct approach to matters such as euthanasia, or the allocation of scarce health resources, or the use of human embryos in research
  - Ethics of cloning – Variety of ethical positions
  - Veterinary ethics – Principles governing veterinary medicine
  - Neuroethics – ethics in neuroscience, but also the neuroscience of ethics
  - Utilitarian bioethics – Branch of bioethics that incorporates principles of utilitarianism
- Organizational ethics – Field of ethics focusing on organizations – ethics among organizations.
- Professional ethics – Principles and rules which guide professional activity
  - Accounting ethics – study of moral values and judgments as they apply to accountancy.
  - Archaeological ethics – Branch of archaeological philosophy
  - Computer ethics – Deals with how computing professionals should make decisions regarding professional and social conduct
    - Ten Commandments of Computer Ethics – Code for ethical use of computers
  - Engineering ethics – Moral principles within the field of engineering
  - Journalism ethics and standards – Principles of ethics and of good practice in journalism
  - Research ethics – Ethical practice in scientific research
    - Internet research ethics
  - Legal ethics – Professional ethics in the legal practice
  - Marketing ethics – Area of applied ethics
  - Media ethics – Subdivision of applied ethics
  - Medical ethics, also known as clinical ethics – System of moral principles of the practice of medicine
    - Evidence-based medical ethics – Practice that uses ethical principles and evidence-based medicine
    - Military medical ethics
  - Nursing ethics – Branch of applied ethics concerned with the field of nursing
- Ethics of technology – Ethical questions specific to the technology age
  - Technoethics – Ethical questions specific to the technology age – the ethics of technology in society
  - Ethics of terraforming – Philosophical debate
  - Cyberethics – Ethics of online activities
  - Ethics of artificial intelligence
    - Machine ethics – the moral behavior of artificial moral agents
    - Roboethics – the moral behavior of humans as they design, construct, use and treat artificially intelligent beings
  - Internet ethics – Ethics of online activities
  - Information ethics – Branch of ethics
- Social ethics – ethics among nations and as one global unit
  - Population ethics – Branch of philosophy concerned with population changes
  - Nonidentity problem – A philosophical problem regarding moral duties to future people, given that actions today affect who exists in the future
  - Sexual ethics – Study of ethical conduct in sexual behavior
- Bridge ethics – codes of ethics applied during play of the card game known as contract bridge
- Environmental ethics – concerned with issues such as the duties of humans towards landscapes and species
  - Animal rights (also known as animal liberation) – the idea that the most basic interests of non-human animals should be afforded the same consideration as the similar interests of human beings
  - Climate ethics – concerned with the ethical dimensions of climate change, and concepts such as climate justice.
  - Environmental virtue ethics – Way of approaching environmental ethics through the lens of virtue ethics
  - Trail ethics – Socially acceptable behaviors on recreational trails
- Ethics of eating meat – Food ethics topic
- Public sector ethics
  - Government ethics
  - Ethics in public administration
  - International ethics – Ethics in International Relations
  - Regulatory ethics

=== Metaethics ===
- Metaethics or moral epistemology – concerns the nature of moral statements, that is, it studies what ethical terms and theories actually refer to.
- Moral syncretism – the attempt to reconcile disparate or contradictory moral beliefs, often while melding the ethical practices of various schools of thought.
- Moral relativism and relativism
- Fallibilism – the philosophical principle that human beings could be wrong about their beliefs, expectations, or their understanding of the world
- Moral skepticism – a class of metaethical theories all members of which entail that no one has any moral knowledge
- Particularism – Philosophical theory
- Rationalism – Epistemological view centered on reason
- Conventionalism – Philosophical belief that principles depend on societal agreements, not external reality
- Axiology – Systematic study of values
- Formal ethics – Formal logical system
- Rationality – Quality of being agreeable to reason
- Discourse ethics – discovering ethical values through argument
- Ethics of justice – 1982 book by Carol Gilligan
- Lawrence Kohlberg's stages of moral development – Psychological theory describing the evolution of moral reasoning
- Evolutionary ethics – Study of evolution on morality or ethics
- Neuroethics – ethics in neuroscience, but also the neuroscience of ethics
- Situated ethics – a view of applied ethics in which abstract standards from a culture or theory are considered to be far less important than the ongoing processes in which one is personally and physically involved
- Philosophical realism – Philosophical concept
- Naturalism – Belief that only natural laws and forces operate in the universe

==== Cognitivism ====
Cognitivism

- Moral realism – Philosophical position
  - Ethical naturalism – Meta-ethical view
  - Ethical non-naturalism – Meta-ethical view
- Moral anti-realism – Opposite position of realism
  - Ethical subjectivism – Philosophical position
  - Moral nihilism – the metaethical view that nothing is intrinsically moral or immoral (see also nihilism)

==== Non-cognitivism ====
Non-cognitivism

- Emotivism – Meta-ethical view
- Universal prescriptivism – Meta-ethical view
- Quasi-realism – Meta-ethical theory

=== Normative ethics ===
Normative ethics – concerns what people should believe to be right and wrong.

- Consequentialism – moral theories that hold that the consequences of one's conduct are the true basis for any judgement about the morality of that conduct. Thus, a morally right act (or omission) is one that will produce a good outcome (the end justifies the means).
  - Utilitarianism – Ethical theory based on maximizing well-being
  - Negative utilitarianism – Philosophical aim of minimizing suffering
  - Ethical hedonism – Family of views prioritizing pleasure
  - Ethical altruism – an ethical doctrine that holds that individuals have a moral obligation to help, serve, or benefit others, if necessary at the sacrifice of self-interest
  - Ethical egoism – the normative ethical position that moral agents ought to do what is in their own self-interest
- Deontological ethics – approach that judges the morality of an action based on the action's adherence to a rule or rules.
  - Moral absolutism – view that certain actions are absolutely right or wrong, regardless of their circumstances such as their consequences or the intentions behind them. Thus stealing, for instance, might be considered to be always immoral, even if done to promote some other good (e.g., stealing food to feed a starving family), and even if it does in the end promote such a good.
  - Graded absolutism – Theory of moral absolutism in Christian ethics
  - Kantian ethics – Ethical theory of Immanuel Kant
- Pragmatic ethics – Theory of normative philosophical ethics and meta-ethics
- Virtue ethics – describes the character of a moral agent as a driving force for ethical behavior.
  - Aristotelian ethics – the beginning of ethics as a subject, in the form of a systematic study of how individuals should best live. Aristotle believed one's goal should be living well and "eudaimonia", a Greek word often translated as "well-being" or "happiness". This could be achieved by the acquisition of a virtuous character, or in other words having well-chosen excellent habits.
    - Nicomachean Ethics – Work on ethics by Aristotle
    - Eudemian Ethics – Work of philosophy by Aristotle
    - Magna Moralia – Work on ethics traditionally attributed to Aristotle
- Eudaimonism – system of ethics that measures happiness in relation to morality.
- Ethics of care – a normative ethical theory
- Living Ethics – Neo-Theosophical doctrine by Roerikh's family
- Religious ethics
  - Divine command theory – claims that ethical sentences express the attitudes of God. Thus, the sentence "charity is good" means "God commands charity".
  - Ethics in the Bible
  - Ayyavazhi ethics – Ethics of Hindu denomination
  - Buddhist ethics – Ethics and code of conduct in Buddhism
    - Buddhist ethics (discipline)
  - Christian ethics – Branch of theology that defines virtuous and sinful behavior from a Christian perspective
    - Situational ethics – Concept in ethics
  - Islamic ethics – Ethics, virtue, and character in Islam
    - Islamic bioethics – Guidance on issues related to human life
  - Jain ethics – Basic code of ethics for Jains
  - Jewish ethics
    - Jewish business ethics
    - Jewish medical ethics – Approach to medical ethics
  - Religious values – Beliefs and practices which a religious adherent partakes in
  - Playing God (ethics) – Rhetorical strategy and accusation
  - Spalding Professor of Eastern Religion and Ethics – Endowed chair at the University of Oxford
  - Ethics and religious culture – a course taught in all elementary and high schools in Quebec
  - Religious views on business ethics – Application of ethical principles to the area of business activities
  - Scientology ethics and justice – Policies and techniques
  - Ethics of circumcision – Variety of ethical positions on circumcision
- Secular ethics – Branch of moral philosophy
- Biocentrism – an ethical point of view which extends inherent value to non-human species,[1] ecosystems, and processes in nature
- Rights ethics – Legal, social, or ethical principles
- Feminist ethics – Approach to ethics

=== Descriptive ethics ===
- Descriptive ethics – Study of people's beliefs about morality
- Moral psychology – Interdisciplinary field of study

=== Related areas ===
- Value theory – Systematic study of values
- Philosophy of economics – Branch of philosophy
- Political philosophy – Study of the foundations of politics
- Philosophy of law – Theoretical study of law
- Deontic logic – Field of philosophical logic
- Religious ethics
- Action theory – Theory of the processes causing willful human bodily movements
- Practical reasoning – Use of reason to decide how to act
- Morality – Standard, doctrine or system of conduct
- Moral character – Steady moral qualities in people
- Visual ethics – Interdisciplinary field of study
- Ethics of belief

== History ==
- History of ethics in Ancient Greece
- History of business ethics – Application of ethical principles to the area of business activities
- History of animal rights – Rights belonging to animals
  - History of animal testing
- History of medical ethics – System of moral principles of the practice of medicine
- History of computer ethics – Philosophy concept in computing
- Contemporary ethics – Discipline of philosophy

== Concepts ==
=== Single principles ===
- Autonomy – Capacity for control, discretion or political self-governance
  - Self-determination – Right to participate in one's own governance
- Egalitarianism – School of thought favoring equality for all people
- Golden Rule – Principle of treating others reciprocally
- Categorical imperative – Central concept in Kantian moral philosophy
  - Universalisability – Concept in Kantian ethics
  - Kingdom of Ends – Part of the categorical imperative theory of Immanuel Kant
- Non-aggression principle – Core concept in libertarianism
- Liberty – State of freedom from constraint
  - Positive liberty – Ability to fulfill one's purposes
  - Negative liberty – Freedom from interference by other people
    - Harm principle – Moral philosophy principle

=== Rights and legal concepts ===
- Consent – Voluntary agreement to another's proposal
- Human rights – Fundamental rights belonging to all humans
- Just War – Doctrine about when a war is ethically just
- Justice – Concept of moral fairness and administration of the law
- Natural and legal rights – Philosophical and political rights
- Political freedom – Concept in history and political thought
- Rights – Legal, social, or ethical principles
- Rule according to higher law – Belief that universal principles of morality override unjust laws

=== Guidelines and basic concepts ===
- Good and evil – Philosophical dichotomy
  - Good – Concept in ethics, religion, and philosophy
  - Evil – Opposite or absence of good
- Commensurability (ethics) – Values which cannot be compared
- Ideal (ethics) – Principle or value that one actively pursues as an ethical goal
- Moral agency – Ability to make ethical judgements
  - Moral responsibility – Concept in ethics
- Moral patienthood – State of mattering morally
- Norm (philosophy) – Sentences used to effect an action
- Principle – Rule, guide or inevitable consequence
- Self-interest – Motivation in human action
- Sin – Transgression against divine law
- Taboo – Societal or cultural prohibition
- Universal code (ethics) – Central concept in Kantian moral philosophy
- Value (ethics) – Personal value, basis for ethical action
  - Extrinsic value or instrumental value
  - Intrinsic value (animal ethics) – Value automatically conferred upon animals
  - Intrinsic value (ethics) – Ethical or philosophic value that an object has "in itself" or "for its own sake"
- Vice – Immoral or depraved behavior or habit
- Virtue – Positive trait or quality deemed to be morally good

=== Human experience ===
- Conscience – Moral philosophy or values of an individual
- Free will – Ability to make choices voluntarily
- Happiness – Positive emotional state
- Love – Strong, positive emotional/mental states
- Moral emotions – Emotions concerning morality
  - Guilt (emotion) – Cognitive or an emotional experience
  - Shame – Unpleasant self-conscious emotion
- Suffering – Pain, mental, or emotional unhappiness

=== Practical ethics ===
- Dual loyalty (ethics) – Loyalty to two separate interests
- Evasion (ethics) – Deceit in which one states a truth that is irrelevant or implies a falsehood
- Trust (social sciences) – Assumption of and reliance on the honesty of another party

== Law ==
- List of ECHR cases concerning legal ethics
- Enron Code of Ethics – Booklet published by Enron Corporation
- Ethics in Government Act – United States federal law
- Medical Code of Ethics – Type of document
- Native American Graves Protection and Repatriation Act – 1990 US law protecting Native American remains and artifacts
- UN Principles of Medical Ethics – Code of medical ethics adopted in 1982

== Government agencies ==
- Canadian House of Commons Standing Committee on Access to Information, Privacy and Ethics – Standing Committee of Canadian house of commons
- Commission on Federal Ethics Law Reform
- Committee on Publication Ethics – Nonprofit organization
- District of Columbia Board of Elections and Ethics – Independent agency administering elections in Washington, D.C.
- Ethics & Religious Liberty Commission – Southern Baptist advocacy group (1997-present)
- Ethics Commission
- Ethics Commissioner (Canada) – Canadian government ethics agency
- Ethics Committee (European Union)
- Ethics committee (disambiguation)
- Federal Ethics Committee on Non-Human Biotechnology
- International Bioethics Committee
- International Ethics Standards Board for Accountants – International body setting ethics standards for accountants
- Jeffersonville Ethics Commission
- Nevada Commission on Ethics – American state government agency
- Office of Congressional Ethics – Nonpartisan entity in the United States
- Oklahoma Ethics Commission
- Pennsylvania State Ethics Commission
- San Francisco Ethics Commission – American local public agency
- Texas Ethics Commission
- The President's Council on Bioethics – Advisory council to US President George W. Bush
- Toi Te Taiao: The Bioethics Council – New Zealand council on bioethnics, 2002-9
- United States House Committee on Ethics – Standing committee of the United States House of Representatives
- United States Office of Government Ethics – Independent agency
- United States Senate Select Committee on Ethics – U.S. government ethical oversight committee

== Awards ==
- Nobel Peace Prize – One of five Nobel Prizes
- Payne Award for Ethics in Journalism

== Organizations ==
- Carnegie Council for Ethics in International Affairs – Non-profit organization in the US
- Center for Ethics at Yeshiva University – Research institute in New York City, New York
- Center for bioethics and medical humanities – University of Mississippi Medical Center unit
- Centre for Applied Ethics – Ethics organization in Hong Kong
- Centre for Human Bioethics – Australian research centre
- Centre for Values, Ethics and the Law in Medicine – Graduate school at the University of Sydney
- Citizens for Responsibility and Ethics in Washington – American nonprofit watchdog organization
- Cumberland School of Law's Center for Biotechnology, Law, and Ethics – Research center in Alabama, US
- Ethics Resource Center – American nonprofit organization
- Ethics and Democracy Network – Political party in Ecuador
- Ethics and Excellence in Journalism Foundation – Nonprofit organization in Oklahoma, US
- Ethics and Public Policy Center – US non-profit organization
- Feminist Approaches to Bioethics – Academic network
- Foundation for Thought and Ethics – American non-profit organization
- Institute for Business and Professional Ethics – DePaul University administrative unit
- Institute for Ethics and Emerging Technologies – US technoprogressive think tank
- Institute for Global Ethics – American nonprofit organization
- Institute for Science, Ethics and Innovation – Research institute in Manchester, UK
- Institute of Business Ethics – Professional organization in London, England
- International Neuroethics Society – Professional ethics organization
- International Society for Environmental Ethics – Organization in Texas, US
- Kenan Institute for Ethics – American interdisciplinary think tank
- Kennedy Institute of Ethics – Academic center at Georgetown University
- Kirby Laing Institute for Christian Ethics – Biblical studies library in Cambridge
- Maguire Center for Ethics – University center in Dallas, Texas, U.S.
- Markkula Center for Applied Ethics – University department in Santa Clara, US
- National Catholic Bioethics Center – Conservative Catholic think tank
- National Core for Neuroethics – Canadian ethics institute
- National Tribunal of Journalistic Ethics – Independent advisory body to the Bolivian press
- Nihon Ethics of Video Association – Japanese video rating organization
- Nuffield Council on Bioethics – UK bioethics organization
- School for Ethics and Global Leadership – Boarding school in Washington, DC, US
- Society for Business Ethics – American non-profit organization
- Society of Jewish Ethics – Academic organization
- St James Ethics Centre – Australian not-for-profit organization
- Standard Ethics Aei – sustainability rating agency based in Brussels
- The Soderquist Center for Leadership and Ethics – American non-profit organization

== Persons influential in the field of ethics ==
- Confucius (551–479 BCE)
- Socrates (469–399 BCE)
- Plato (424/423–348/347 BCE)
- Aristippus (c. 435–356 BCE)
- Aristotle (384–322 BCE)
- Mencius (c. 372–289 BCE)
- Epicurus (341–270 BCE)
- Jesus (7–2 BCE – 30–36 CE)
- Epictetus (55–135 CE)
- Augustine of Hippo (354–430)
- Thomas Aquinas (1225–1274)
- Baruch Spinoza (1632–1677)
- David Hume (1711–1776)
- Immanuel Kant (1724–1804)
- Jeremy Bentham (1748–1832)
- Georg W. F. Hegel (1770–1831)
- Arthur Schopenhauer (1788–1860)
- John Stuart Mill (1806–1873)
- Søren Kierkegaard (1813–1855)
- Henry Sidgwick (1838–1900)
- William James (1842–1910)
- Friedrich Nietzsche (1844–1900)
- John Dewey (1859–1952)
- Mohandas Karamchand Gandhi (1869–1948)
- G. E. Moore (1873–1958)
- Paul Tillich (1886–1965)
- Karl Barth (1886–1968)
- J. L. Mackie (1917–1981)
- G.E.M. Anscombe (1919–2001)
- R. M. Hare (1919–2002)
- Philippa Foot (1920–2010)
- John Rawls (1921–2002)
- Bernard Williams (1929–2003)
- Alasdair MacIntyre (1929–2025)
- Thomas Nagel (born 1937)
- Derek Parfit (1942–2017)
- Peter Singer (born 1946)
- Jonathan Dancy (born 1946)

== Events ==
- Asilomar Conference on Recombinant DNA – Influential 1975 academic meeting held in California
- Ethics Bowl – Annual intercollegiate debate competition
- Foucault–Habermas debate concerning power within society

== Publications ==
- Ethics in America – television series, 1988–89
- Lindner Ethics Complaint of the 83rd Minnesota Legislative Session – 2004 ethics complaint in the United States

=== Books ===
- Nicomachean Ethics – most popular ethics treatise by Aristotle
- Eudemian Ethics – Work of philosophy by Aristotle
- Magna Moralia – Work on ethics traditionally attributed to Aristotle
- Encyclopaedia of Religion and Ethics – 1908–1927 12-volume encyclopedia
- Encyclopedia of Ethics – Scholarly work focused on ethical theory
- Ethics, Institutions, and the Right to Philosophy – 2002 book by J. Derrida and P. Trifonas
- Ethics – Philosophical treatise written by Spinoza
- Life sciences, ethics and democracy – Academic book series
- How to Observe Morals and Manners – 1838 book by Harriet Martineau
- The Ethics of Ambiguity – 1947 book by Simone de Beauvoir
- The Ethics of Liberty – 1982 book by Murray Rothbard
- The Methods of Ethics – 1874 book by Henry Sidgwick
- Principia Ethica – 1903 book by G. E. Moore
- The Right and the Good – 1930 book by W. D. Ross
- Rationality and Power: Democracy in Practice – 1998 book by Bent Flyvbjerg
- Practical Ethics – 1979 book by Peter Singer

=== Journals ===
- American Journal of Bioethics
- Bioethics
- Business Ethics Quarterly
- Business and Professional Ethics Journal
- Cambridge Quarterly of Healthcare Ethics
- Environmental Ethics
- Ethics & International Affairs
- Ethics (journal)
- Ethics and Language
- Experiments in Ethics
- IRB: Ethics & Human Research
- Journal of Business Ethics
- Journal of Business Ethics Education
- Journal of Empirical Research on Human Research Ethics
- Journal of Information Ethics
- Journal of Medical Ethics
- Kennedy Institute of Ethics Journal
- Legal Trends in Bioethics
- Narrative Inquiry in Bioethics
- Neuroethics
- Notre Dame Journal of Law, Ethics & Public Policy
- Professional Ethics
- Religion & Ethics Newsweekly
- Teaching Ethics
- The Economics and Ethics of Private Property
- The Freedom Paradox: Towards a Post-Secular Ethics
- The Journal of Ethics

== See also ==
- Index of ethics articles – Overview of and topical guide to ethics
- Outline of philosophy
- Resources for clinical ethics consultation – index article
