= Ethics committee (disambiguation) =

An ethics committee is a body that oversees the conduct of medical research and other human experimentation, in USA also called institutional review board.

Ethics committee may also refer to non-medical committees:

- Canadian House of Commons Standing Committee on Access to Information, Privacy and Ethics
- Ethics committee (European Union)
- Federal Ethics Committee on Non-Human Biotechnology (Switzerland)
- FIFA Ethics Committee
- Philippine House Committee on Ethics and Privileges
- Philippine Senate Committee on Ethics and Privileges
- United States House Committee on Ethics (popularly known as the Ethics Committee)
- United States Senate Select Committee on Ethics
- Ethics commission
