= Don Soderquist =

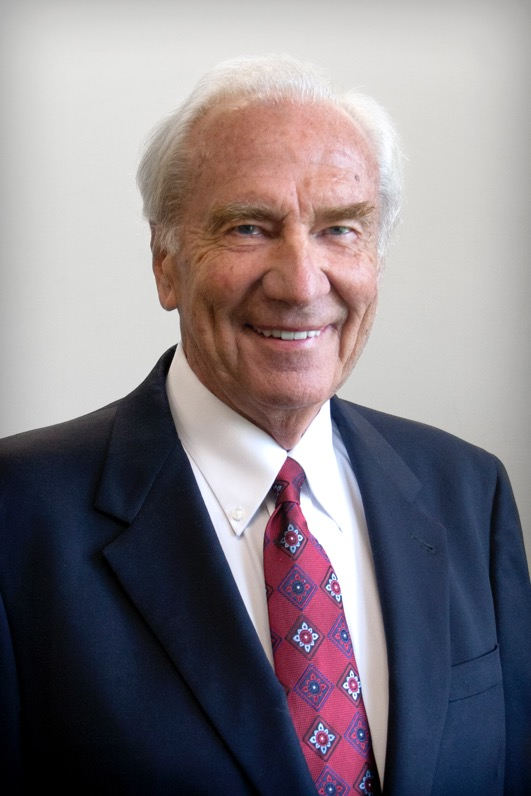
- Born: January 29, 1934; Chicago, Illinois, U.S.
- Died: July 21, 2016 (aged 82); Rochester, Minnesota, U.S.
- Education: Wheaton College (Illinois)
- Known for: Chief Operating Officer and Senior Vice Chairman of Wal-Mart Stores Inc.
- Spouse: JoAnn Soderquist
- Children: Mark Soderquist, Wendy Togami, Sandie Ford, Jeff Soderquist
- Website: soderquist.org

Donald G. Soderquist (January 29, 1934 – July 21, 2016) was an American businessman known for his work as chief operating officer and senior vice chairman of Wal-Mart Stores Inc.

== Early life ==
Don Soderquist was born on January 29, 1934, in Chicago, Illinois. He attended Wheaton College (Ill.), where he earned his bachelor of arts degree in business administration in 1955. Soon after graduation, he married JoAnn (Jo) Pollard in Wheaton, Illinois. He then served in the U.S. Army Finance Corps from 1957 – 1959. He and Jo had four children: Mark, Wendy, Sandie and Jeff.

== Career ==
Soderquist began his career working for City Products, later becoming president for Ben Franklin Stores. He joined Walmart as executive vice president in 1980 and served in several executive positions before his appointment to vice chairman and chief operating officer.

He worked for the five-and-dime and craft chain Ben Franklin stores for 16 years, six of which he served as president and chief executive officer. During his time at Ben Franklin, Soderquist met Sam Walton, founder of Wal-Mart Stores Inc. Several times Walton tried to persuade Soderquist to join his team at Walmart. In 1980, Walton hired Soderquist to serve as the Wal-Mart Stores Inc. executive vice president; Soderquist went on to serve in several other executive positions during his tenure at Walmart including senior vice chairman and chief operating officer. During that time, Walmart's revenues expanded from $1 billion to more than $200 billion. He officially retired from Walmart in 2002.

After retiring from Walmart, Soderquist turned his focus to Soderquist Leadership, a leadership center providing values-focused development training for more than 50,000 people since it was founded in 1998. The center was a joint effort between Soderquist and John Brown University President Lee Balzer.

During his career, Soderquist received multiple board appointments. He served on the Board of Trustees for John Brown University from 1982 – 2009, and as chair of the board from 1991 – 2002. He was fulfilling board appointments for Arvest Bank of Benton County and Cinemark Theatres when he died.

== Death ==
Soderquist died at the age of 82 on July 21, 2016, due to complications from heart surgery. A memorial service was held in his honor at Fellowship Bible NWA in Rogers, Arkansas, on July 29, 2016.

== Philanthropy ==
Soderquist was active in his community, supporting charities and nonprofits alike. He received multiple awards for his work in this area including the Dick Trammel Good Neighbor Award from the Rogers-Lowell Area Chamber of Commerce in 2009, and the Advocate for Innocence Award for Outstanding Community Partner from the Children's Advocacy Center of Benton County in 2015.

Three nonprofits Soderquist worked closely with were Lake Geneva Camps and Conferences (Lake Geneva, Wisconsin), New Life Ranch (Colcord, Oklahoma), and Westlawn Youth Network (Bellwood, Illinois).

== Honors ==
- 1990 - Received Outstanding Business Leader Award from the Northwood Institute in Palm Beach, Florida.
- 1996 - Inducted into the Retailing Hall of Fame.
- 2009 - Elected Trustee Emeritus at John Brown University.
- 2011 - Inducted into the Arkansas Business Hall of Fame in 2011.
- 2013 - John Brown University named their business college after Soderquist.

Soderquist also received Honorary Doctorate Degrees from Southwest Baptist University in Bolivar, Missouri, from John Brown University, and from Judson College in Elgin, Illinois.

== Publications ==
Soderquist, Don (2005), The Wal-Mart Way: The Inside Story of the Success of the World's Largest Company, Thomas Nelson, ISBN 0785261192.

Soderquist, Don (2006), Live Learn Lead to Make a Difference, Thomas Nelson, ISBN 1404101497.
