= Dual loyalty (ethics) =

Loyalty to two separate interests

In ethics, dual loyalty is loyalty to two separate interests that potentially entails a conflict of interest.

A frequently cited example of the term "dual loyalty" is used in connection with physicians who must balance, on the one hand, the physician's loyalty to a patient (and/or the regulations that govern the physician-patient relationship), and on the other hand, the institution or country for which the physician serves.

For example, a doctor who is asked by a government to assess a prisoner's fitness to withstand torture faces an enormous ethical dilemma because of the competing loyalties of the doctor to the state versus the physician's code of ethics and his/her commitment to a patient's human rights.

== See also ==
- Ethics
