= Buddhist ethics (discipline) =

Buddhist ethics as an academic discipline is relatively new, blossoming in the mid-1990s. Much like Critical Buddhism and Buddhist modernism, it is a result of recent exchanges of Eastern and Western thought. While generally thought of as a sub-field of Buddhist studies, the discipline of Buddhist ethics draws together history, philosophy, religious studies, anthropology, and more in an attempt to understand what may be the fundamental question of Buddhism: how ought man live?

Specific work has been produced on Buddhist ethics dating back to the 1920s. Early descriptive accounts of Buddhist ethics include Tachibana's Ethics of Buddhism (1926), focused on Theravādin ethics, and Poussin's La Morale Bouddhique (1927), based on Mahāyāna texts. Other early authors that expressed interest in Buddhist ethics include Caroline Augusta Foley Rhys Davids and Isaline Blew Horner. In 1979 the Journal of Religious Ethics featured a section devoted to the study of Theravādin ethics. featuring four prominent scholars in Buddhist studies.

== History ==
Buddhist ethics emerged as an academic discipline in 1992, with the publication of Damien Keown's book The Nature of Buddhist Ethics. His subsequent co-founding of the Journal of Buddhist Ethics in 1994 further solidified the birth of a new field in the discipline of Buddhist studies. Prior to Keown's book, only a handful of books and articles existed that attempted to delve into the questions of a specifically Buddhist ethic. Even more daunting, however, has been the separation of 'ethics' from the rest of Buddhism. It has also been argued, by Keown and others, that the very question the Buddha sought to answer was a purely ethical one, namely, "the perennial problem of the best kind of life for man to lead."

== Trends ==
=== Aristotle / virtue ===
In Buddhist Ethics as Virtue Ethics, Nick Gier compares Buddha's ethical teachings to Aristotle's, "Like Greek virtue ethics, Buddhist ethics is also humanistic and thoroughly personalist."

Damien Keown devotes a great deal of his work to debunking claims that Buddhism is utilitarian in nature. His work then goes on to examine the structure of Buddhist ethics, focusing specifically on morality (Pali: siila). His conclusion is that Buddhist ethics most closely resembles the ancient Greek virtue ethics found in Aristotle.

James Whitehill, in Buddhist Ethics in Western Context: The Virtues Approach, says, "Buddhism's legitimation in the West can be partially met by demonstrating that Buddhist morality is a virtue-oriented, character-based, community-focused ethics, commensurate with the Western 'ethics of virtue' tradition."

=== Bentham/Mill - utilitarian ===
Mark Siderits suggests that the doctrine of anatta provides the grounding for an "aretaic consequentialism" in which the goal is the alleviation of suffering for all beings (realizing that there is no "self" to be freed apart from others). He follows a long line of thinkers in Buddhist ethics.

Philosopher David Pearce compares Buddhist ethics and utilitarianism and suggests that although both have the abolition of suffering as a common aim, in practice these two ethical systems often disagree about means. Specifically, Pearce writes that “[m]ost Buddhists would challenge the idea that technology offers an escape-route from the pain of earthly existence.” Pearce also questions the Buddhist idea that desire always leads to suffering, giving melancholia and anhedonia and hyperthymia as counter-examples.

=== Traditional Buddhist ethics ===
Two key teachers of traditional Buddhist ethics are Hammalawa Saddhatissa and Padmasiri De Silva. Saddhatissa was a Sri Lankan Buddhist monk who wrote Buddhist Ethics in 1970 (reprinted in 1987, 1997 & 2003). De Silva has a similar work, Buddhism, Ethics and Society: The Conflicts and Dilemmas of Our Times (2002). A third, and less notable work is The Way to Social Harmony (1989, available online) by Venerable U Pyinnyathiha.

These works can be invaluable as an introduction into key Buddhist canonical texts such as the Sigalovada Sutta.
