= Contemporary ethics =

Discipline of philosophy

Ethics is, in general terms, the study of right and wrong. It can look descriptively at moral behaviour and judgements; it can give practical advice (normative ethics), or it can analyse and theorise about the nature of morality and ethics.

Contemporary study of ethics has many links with other disciplines in philosophy itself and other sciences. Normative ethics has declined, while meta-ethics is increasingly followed. Abstract theorizing has in many areas been replaced by experience-based research.

== Practical and theoretical areas ==
Psychology, sociology, politics, medicine and neurobiology are areas which have helped and been helped in progress in ethics. Within philosophy, epistemology (or the study of how we know) has drawn closer to ethics. This is in part due to the recognition that knowledge, like value and goodness, can be seen as a normative concept. The traditional analyses and definitions of knowledge have been shown to be unsound by the Gettier problem.

New interest has flourished in meta-ethics. This has in recent years developed as a recognised category proceeding from the work of Hume, G. E. Moore and the error theories of J. L. Mackie who seeks a real basis, if any, for talk of values and right and wrong. Mackie is sceptical about solving the dilemma posed by the distinction between values and facts.

== Reason vs intuition ==
The dominance of reason has come under increasing challenge from various quarters. Heidegger's work has become increasingly translated and interpreted in the Anglo-American sphere and the wisdom of always following reason is widely questioned.

The ethics of care, and environmental ethics are other flourishing areas of research. These point to a general increasing cultural awareness of the hitherto dominance of reason and male based values in society rather than a relational, contextual and communitarian view of the social world. Reason and emotion are seen as more equal partners in human actions

There remain major divergences of perspective, for example between continental and analytic approaches, and process/ pragmatism vs logical, a priori approaches.

Edmund Gettier wrote a short but influential article showing that knowledge is not captured by a traditionally accepted reason based definitions. Pragmatism, and process philosophy in general, is increasingly adopted as a response to a constantly changing understanding of a dynamic world, both physically and in the realms of experiment and investigation.

== Changed focus ==
Mackie (1977) states that increasing secularisation has meant that religion is not seen by many as the ground for deciding how we should act. Quine's critique of the analytic–synthetic distinction has implications for morality (for example in the work of Kant). Logic is a diverse and apparently flexible branch of thought, rather than being thought to underlie mathematics and reasoning, as previously.

Postmodernism and its aftermath has left behind the aspiration for an overarching theory of ethics, single ideas which were reputed to explain or justify whole aspects of human experience and knowledge, such as Marxism, religion, Freudianism or nationalism. Writers as diverse as Jean-François Lyotard and J L Mackie (1977) point to the decline in grand narratives. Mackie (1977), in particular, saw this decline as undermining the legitimacy of traditional morality.

This has stimulated the development of both error theory and meta-ethics as moves to either review or to strengthen the basis of our inherited value systems. As a result, there is growing acceptance of the plausibility of making decisions based on the context, and the particular situation being considered, rather than by reference to principles. This move away from grand theory confirms earlier views of Adam Smith, who held that moral theories derived from moral actions rather than conversely.

== Challenges remaining ==
Major challenges for ethics include the fact/value distinction, the error theory which seems to undermine the reality of moral claims and apparent relativism across cultures and eras. Some feel that the persistence of problems in ethics theory has led to an overall decline in the interest in working in the field of pure ethics as more opportunities arise in applied ethics and meta-ethics. Stephen Darwall et al referred to "a genuinely new period in twentieth century ethics, the vigorous revival of metaethics coincidental with the emergence .. of a criticism of the enterprise of moral theory itself".
