= Federal Ethics Committee on Non-Human Biotechnology =

Under article 23 of the Gene Technology Act, the Swiss Federal Ethics Committee on Non-Human Biotechnology (ECNH) is an extra-parliamentary advisory committee, appointed to advise the Federal Council and the federal and cantonal authorities on matters of regulations and enforcement of legislation in the field of non-human biotechnology. The Federal Council established the ECNH by decree on 27 April 1998. It is administratively attached to the Federal Office for the Environment in the Department of Environment, Transport, Energy and Communications.

== Mandate ==
The ECNH monitors and evaluates developments in and applications of non-human biotechnology and comments from an ethical perspective on the scientific and social questions arising in this connection. It advises

- a. the Federal Council on the introduction of regulations;
- b. the federal and cantonal authorities on matters of enforcement. In particular, it shall comment on licence applications or research projects of fundamental or exemplary importance; for this purpose, it may inspect documents, request information and consult other experts.

It collaborates with other federal and cantonal committees concerned with questions of biotechnology. It engages in a dialogue with the public on ethical issues associated with biotechnology. It reports to the Federal Council periodically on its activities.

== Members ==
The ECNH consists of 12 members from a range of disciplines, either specialists in ethics or coming from other fields but with a scientific or practical knowledge of ethics. Various ethical approaches also need to be represented in a balanced manner.

The members of the committee are appointed by the Federal Council for a term of 4 years.

- Klaus Peter Rippe (chair), Professor of Practical Philosophy and principal of the University of Education Karlsruhe (Germany), director of "ethik im diskurs", Zurich
- Markus Arnold, Lecturer of Ethics and Director of Studies at the Institute of Religious Education, University of Lucerne
- Monika Betzler, chair in Practical Philosophy at the Ludwig-Maximilians-Universität München
- Christine Clavien, Maître d'Enseignement et de Recherche (MER) of Philosophy, Institut Éthique Histoire Humanités, University of Geneva
- Eva Gelinksy, Research assistant at ProSpecieRara, staff member of the Initiative for GE-free Seeds and Breeding (IG Saatgut)
- Greta Guarda, Assistant professor of biology at the Faculty of Biology and Medicine, University of Lausanne
- Gérald Hess, Maître d'Enseignement et de Recherche (MER) of Ethics and Environmental Philosophy at the Faculty of Geosciences and the Environment, University of Lausanne
- Tosso Leeb, Professor of veterinary medicine genetics and animal breeding, director of the Institute of Genetics, Vetsuisse Faculty, University of Bern
- Matthias Mahlmann, Chair of Legal Theory, Legal Sociology and International Public Law at the Faculty of Law, University of Zurich
- Jean-Marc Neuhaus, Professor of Biochemistry and Molecular Biology, University of Neuchâtel
- Otto Schäfer, Responsible for theological and ethical questions at the Federation of Swiss Protestant Churches (SEK/FEPS), Bern
- Markus Wild, Professor of Theoretical Philosophy at the Philosophy Department, University of Basel

== Secretariat ==
The committee is assisted by a scientific secretariat, which reports to the Chair of the committee and is administratively attached to the Federal Office for the Environment (FOEN).

== Publications ==
=== The most important statements issued by the Committee ===
- The Dignity of Animals, A joint statement by the Federal Ethics Committee on Non Human Biotechnology (ECNH) and the Swiss Committee on Animal Experiments (SCAE), concerning a more concrete definition of the dignity of creation with regard to animals, 2001.
- Patents on Animals and Plants – A contribution to discussion, 2001.
- Gene Technology for Food - Ethical considerations for the marketing of genetically modified foodstuffs and animal feed, 2003.
- Gene Technology and Developing Countries - A contribution to the discussion from an ethical perspective, 2004.
- Research on Primates - an Ethical Evaluation, Report by the Swiss Committee on Animal Experiments (SCAE) and the Swiss Ethics Committee on Non Human Biotechnology (ECNH), 2006.
- The Dignity of Living Beings with regard to Plants. Moral consideration of plants for their own sake, 2008.
- Synthetic biology. Ethical considerations, 2010.
- Release of genetically modified plants – ethical requirements, 2012.
- Ethical treatment of fish, 2014.
- Freedom of research and biosecurity – Ethical considerations by the example of dual use research of concern, 2015 (in German and French only).
- New Plant Breeding Techniques – Ethical Considerations, 2016.

=== "Beiträge zur Ethik und Biotechnologie" series ===
Expert reports commissioned by the ECNH which are of interest to a wider audience are published (in the original language) in a series entitled „Beiträge zur Ethik und Biotechnologie“ (Contributions to Ethics and Biotechnology). These reports provide a basis for consideration of the ethical aspects of biotechnology and serve as working papers for the ECNH.

- Volume 1: Andreas Bachmann, Nano(bio)technologie – Eine ethische Auslegeordnung (Nano(bio)technology – An ethical review), 2006.
- Volume 2: Jürg Stöcklin, Die Pflanze – Moderne Konzepte der Biologie (The Plant – Modern biological concepts), 2007.
- Volume 3: Andreas Brenner, Leben – Eine philosophische Untersuchung (Life – A philosophical investigation), 2007.
- Volume 4: Benjamin Rath, Ethik des Risikos – Begriffe, Situationen, Entscheidungstheorien und Aspekte (Ethics of Risk - Concepts, situations, decision theories and other aspects), 2008.
- Volume 5: Joachim Boldt, Oliver Müller, Giovanni Maio, Synthetische Biologie – Eine ethisch-philosophische Analyse (Synthetic biology – an ethical and philosophical analysis), 2009.
- Volume 6: Bernard Baertschi. La vie artificielle. Le statut moral des êtres vivants artificiels, 2009.
- Volume 7: Arianna Ferrari, Christopher Coenen, Armin Grunwald, Arnold Sauter, Animal Enhancement – Neue technische Möglichkeiten und ethische Fragen, 2010.
- Volume 8: Peter Kunzmann, Nikolaus Knoepffler, Primaten – Ihr moralischer Status, 2011.
- Volume 9: Helmut Segner, Fish – Nociception and pain. A biological perspective, 2012.
- Volume 10: Markus Wild, Fische – Kognition, Bewusstsein und Schmerz. Eine philosophische Perspektive, 2012.
- Volume 11: Biosecurity und Publikationsfreiheit – Die Veröffentlichung heikler Forschungsdaten im Spannungsfeld von Freiheit und Sicherheit. Eine grundrechtliche Analyse, 2014.

== Miscellaneous ==
In October 2008, the ECNH was awarded the Ig Nobel Prize for the publication of "The dignity of living beings with regard to plants - Moral consideration of plants for their own sake".
