= Life sciences, ethics and democracy =

Academic book series

Life sciences, ethics and democracy (LSED) is a peer reviewed academic book series that was founded in 2011 and is published by Rodopi.

The spectacular progress of the life sciences during the last decades poses new ethical, social and political challenges. In our days, questions of scientific truth and scientific progress are inextricably intertwined with questions concerning ethics, social justice and democratic participation. This series focuses on newly emerging conceptual and practical interfaces between the life sciences, the social sciences and the humanities, in order to address this new complexity in scientifically and socially responsible ways.

== ISSNs ==
(ISSN 2211-4416)
E-ISSN: 2211-4424

== Editors ==
Peter Derkx
Erica Haimes
Harry Kunneman

== Volumes ==
- # 1 Genomics and Democracy: Towards a ‘Lingua Democratica’ for the Public Debate on Genomics. Edited by Peter Derkx and Harry Kunneman. ISBN 978-90-420-3719-9 E-ISBN 978-94-012-0975-5
