= Soderquist Leadership =

American non-profit organization

Coordinates: 36°11′20″N 94°33′26″W

Soderquist Leadership, initially named The Soderquist Center for Leadership and Ethics, was founded in 1998 by the retired chief operating officer and senior vice chairman of Walmart Stores, Inc., Don Soderquist. It is a 501(c)3 non-profit organization under the umbrella of John Brown University, a private, interdenominational, Christian liberal arts college in Siloam Springs, in the U.S. state of Arkansas.

== Don Soderquist, founder ==
Known for his extensive career with Walmart Stores Inc., Don Soderquist first held multiple leadership roles with Ben Franklin Stores; he served as president and chief executive officer of the five-and-dime craft chain his last six years there. In 1980, Soderquist began his career with Walmart Stores, Inc. as an executive vice president. He held a number of roles within the company before retiring as senior vice chairman. During his tenure, he became known as the "Keeper of the Culture" after the passing of Sam Walton in 1992. Throughout retirement, Don spoke and wrote on topics including business, 21st century leadership, ethics, and the story of Walmart. He died July 21, 2016.

== History ==
Sensing a need for renewed commitment to business leadership and ethics in the marketplace, a group of thought leaders including Dr. Lee Balzer, then-president of John Brown University, approached Soderquist and his wife JoAnn with a proposal to create a training and development center. Soderquist agreed to serve as the founding executive and cast a distinctive vision for the future of the center.

The Soderquist Center was formally established in 1998 with the goal of providing experiential learning for current and future leaders. Since its founding, the leadership center has provided values-focused development training for more than 50,000 people. Today, the organization offers team building sessions through high and low adventure ropes courses on its BaseCamp site three seasons out of four each year.

In 2002, The Soderquist Family Foundation purchased Greystone Estate from the Sloan family of Northwest Arkansas for use as an executive retreat. Soderquist Leadership operates and maintains the estate and hosts a variety of leadership development programs on its grounds. The property is 95 wooded acres with lakefront access to Beaver Lake. In addition to the 16,000-square-foot mansion, the property also features a ropes course for adventure learning referred to as BaseCamp2.

In 2005, The Soderquist Family Foundation helped fund the construction of The Soderquist Business Center on the campus of John Brown. The building houses the undergraduate business division on the first floor and The Soderquist Center on the second floor.

== Soderquist Fellowship ==
Since its founding, The Soderquist Center has invested in the lives of young people through the Soderquist Fellowship. A two-year program, Fellows are required to work 35 hours per week for The Center. In return, they are paid a stipend and awarded a full scholarship to John Brown University’s graduate school of business or school of visual arts. Fellows can pursue either a master's degree in Fine Art (MFA), a master's degree in Business Administration (MBA), or a master's degree in Leadership and Ethics (MSLE).
