= Descriptive ethics =

Study of people's beliefs about morality

Descriptive ethics, also known as comparative ethics, is the study of people's beliefs about morality. It contrasts with prescriptive or normative ethics, which is the study of ethical theories that prescribe how people ought to act, and with meta-ethics, which is the study of what ethical terms and theories actually refer to. The following examples of questions that might be considered in each field illustrate the differences between the fields:

- Descriptive ethics: What do people think is right?
- Meta-ethics: What does "right" even mean?
- Normative (prescriptive) ethics: How should people act?
- Applied ethics: How do we take moral knowledge and put it into practice?

== Description ==
Descriptive ethics is a form of empirical research into the attitudes of individuals or groups of people. In other words, this is the division of philosophical or general ethics that involves the observation of the moral decision-making process with the goal of describing the phenomenon. Those working on descriptive ethics aim to uncover people's beliefs about such things as values, which actions are right and wrong, and which characteristics of moral agents are virtuous. Research into descriptive ethics may also investigate people's ethical ideals or what actions societies reward or punish in law or politics.

Because descriptive ethics involves empirical investigation, it is a field that is usually investigated by those working in the fields of evolutionary biology, psychology, sociology or anthropology. Information that comes from descriptive ethics is, however, also used in philosophical arguments.

Value theory can be either normative or descriptive but is usually descriptive.

== Lawrence Kohlberg: An example of descriptive ethics ==
Lawrence Kohlberg is one example of a psychologist working on descriptive ethics. In one study, for example, Kohlberg questioned a group of boys about what would be a right or wrong action for a man facing a moral dilemma (specifically, the Heinz dilemma): should he steal a drug to save his wife, or refrain from theft even though that would lead to his wife's death? Kohlberg's concern was not which choice the boys made, but the moral reasoning that lay behind their decisions. After carrying out a number of related studies, Kohlberg devised a theory about the development of human moral reasoning that was intended to reflect the moral reasoning actually carried out by the participants in his research. Kohlberg's research can be classed as descriptive ethics to the extent that he describes human beings' actual moral development. If, in contrast, he had aimed to describe how humans ought to develop morally, his theory would have involved prescriptive ethics.

== See also ==
- Experimental philosophy
- List of ethics topics
- Moral reasoning
- Moral psychology
