= Glossary of philosophy =

This glossary of philosophy is a list of definitions of terms and concepts relevant to philosophy and related disciplines, including logic, ethics, and theology.

== A ==
absolutism
The philosophy, developed by Hegel, viewing all possible states of being as part of a greater totality of experiences.
absurdism
The philosophy stating that the efforts of humanity to find meaning in the Universe will ultimately fail because no such meaning exists (at least in relation to humanity). Absurdism is related to existentialism, though should not be confused with it, nor with nihilism.
accidentalism
Any system of thought that denies the causal nexus and maintains that events succeed one another haphazardly or by chance (not in the mathematical but in the popular sense). In metaphysics, accidentalism denies the doctrine that everything occurs or results from a definite cause. In this connection it is synonymous with tychism (ruxi, chance), a term used by Charles Sanders Peirce for the theories that make chance an objective factor in the process of the Universe.
acosmism
The philosophy that denies the reality of the Universe, seeing it as ultimately illusory, and only the infinite Unmanifest Absolute as real. In contrast to pantheism, acosmism begins with the recognition that there is only one Reality, which is infinite, non-dual, blissful, etc. Yet the phenomenal reality of which humans are normally aware is none of these things; it is in fact just the opposite—i.e., dualistic, finite, full of suffering and pain, and so on. And since the Absolute is the only reality, that means that everything that is not Absolute cannot be real. Thus, according to this viewpoint, the phenomenal dualistic world is ultimately an illusion ("Maya" to use the technical Indian term), irrespective of the apparent reality it possesses at the mundane or empirical level.
aestheticism
A loosely defined movement in art and literature popular in late 19th-century Britain which held that art does not have any didactic purpose (it need only be beautiful), and that life should imitate art. The main characteristics of the movement were suggestion rather than statement, sensuality, massive use of symbols, and synaesthetic effects – that is, correspondence between words, colors, and music.
agnostic atheism
The philosophical view that encompasses both atheism and agnosticism. Due to definitional variance, an agnostic atheist does not believe in any deity and by extension holds true that "the existence and nonexistence of deities is currently unknown and may be absolutely unknowable", or that "knowledge of the existence and nonexistence of deities is irrelevant or unimportant", or that "abstention from claims of knowledge of the existence and nonexistence of deities is optimal". Contrast agnostic theism.
agnostic theism
The philosophical view that encompasses both theism and agnosticism. An agnostic theist is one who views that the truth value of claims regarding the existence of any deity is unknown or inherently unknowable, but still chooses to believe in god or gods in spite of this. Contrast agnostic atheism.
agnosticism
The philosophical view that the truth values of certain claims — particularly theological claims regarding the existence of god, gods, or deities — are unknown, inherently unknowable, or incoherent, and therefore irrelevant to life. Agnosticism itself, in both its strong (explicit) and weak (implicit) forms, is necessarily neither an atheist nor a theist position, though an agnostic person may also be either an atheist, a theist, or one who endorses neither position.
altruism
The belief that people have a moral obligation to serve others or the "greater good". It is generally opposed to the concepts of self-interest and egoism.
amor fati
A Latin phrase that may be translated as "love of fate" or "love of one's fate". It is used to describe an attitude in which one sees everything that happens in one's life, including suffering and loss, as good or, at the very least, necessary, in that they are among the facts of one's life and existence, so they are always necessarily there whether one likes them or not. Moreover, amor fati is characterized by a passive acceptance of the events or situations that occur in one's life.
anarchism
The political position of any of a number of views and movements which advocate the absence or elimination of rulership or government. Other than being opposed to the state, there is no single defining position that all anarchists hold. Compare and contrast libertarianism.
anarcho-capitalism
A philosophy based on the idea of individual sovereignty, and a prohibition against initiatory coercion and fraud. It sees the only just basis for law as arising from private property norms and an unlimited right of contract between sovereign individuals. From this basis, anarcho-capitalism rejects the state as an unjustified monopolist and aggressor against sovereign individuals, and embraces anti-statist laissez-faire capitalism. Anarcho-capitalists would aim to protect individual liberty and property by replacing a government monopoly, which is involuntarily funded through taxation, with private, competing businesses.
anarcho-primitivism
An anarchist critique of the origins and progress of civilization. Primitivists argue that the shift from hunter-gatherers to agricultural subsistence gave rise to social stratification, coercion, and alienation. They advocate a return to non-"civilized" ways of life through deindustrialisation, abolition of division of labor or specialization, and abandonment of technology.
anarcho-syndicalism
A form of anarchism that allies itself with syndicalism, that is, with labor unions, as a force for revolutionary social change. Anarcho-syndicalists seek to replace capitalism and the state with a democratically worker-managed means of production. They seek to abolish the wage system and most forms of private property.
anima mundi
The "world soul"; a universal soul encompassing all individual souls within itself.
animism
"Animism" has been applied to many different philosophical systems. This includes Aristotle's view of the relation of soul and body held also by the stoics and scholastics. On the other hand, monadology (Leibniz) has also been described as animistic. The name is most commonly applied to vitalism, which makes life, or life and mind, the directive principle in evolution and growth, holding that life is not merely mechanical but that there is a directive force that guides energy without altering its amount. An entirely different class of ideas, also termed animistic, is the belief in the "world soul", held by Plato, Schelling and others. Lastly, in discussions of religion, "animism" refers to the belief in indwelling souls or spirits, particularly so-called "primitive" religions that consider everything inhabited by spirits.
anthropocentrism

The practice, conscious or otherwise, of regarding the existence and concerns of human beings as the central fact of the universe. This is similar, but not identical, to the practice of relating all that happens in the universe to the human experience. To clarify, the first position concludes that the fact of human existence is the point of universal existence; the latter merely compares all activity to that of humanity, without making any teleological conclusions.
anthropomorphism
A form of personification involving the attribution of human characteristics and qualities to non-human beings, objects, or natural phenomena. Animals, forces of nature, and unseen or unknown authors of chance are frequent subjects of anthropomorphosis. Two examples are the attribution of a human body or of human qualities generally to god (or the gods), and creating imaginary persons who are the embodiment of an abstraction such as Death, Lust, War, or the Four Horsemen of the Apocalypse. Anthropomorphism is similar to prosopopoeia (adopting the persona of another person).
antinatalism
A philosophical position that assigns a negative value to birth. Antinatalists argue that people should refrain from procreation because it is morally bad.
Antinomianism
In theology, the idea that members of a particular religious group are under no obligation to obey the laws of ethics or morality as presented by religious authorities. Antinomianism is the polar opposite of legalism, the notion that obedience to a code of religious law is necessary for salvation. The term has become a point of contention among opposed religious authorities. Few groups or sects explicitly call themselves "antinomian", but the charge is often levelled by some sects against competing sects.
anti-realism
Any position involving either the denial of the objective reality of entities of a certain type or the insistence that humans should be agnostic about their real existence. Thus, people may speak of anti-realism with respect to other minds, the past, the future, universals, mathematical entities (such as natural numbers), moral categories, the material world, or even thought.
Aristotelianism
The philosophical tradition that takes its defining inspiration from the work of Aristotle and the Peripatetic school. Sometimes contrasted by critics with the rationalism and idealism of Plato, Aristotelianism is understood by its proponents as critically developing Plato's theories. Most particularly, Aristotelianism brings Plato's ideals down to Earth as goals and goods internal to natural species that are realized in activity. This is the characteristically Aristotelian idea of teleology.
Arminianism
A school of soteriological thought in Protestant Christian theology founded by the Dutch theologian Jacobus Arminius. Arminianism is closely related to Calvinism (or Reformed theology), and the two systems share both their histories and many doctrines in common.
asceticism
A way of life characterised by an austere existence that refrains from worldly pleasures. Those who practice ascetic lifestyles often perceive their practices as virtuous and pursue them to achieve greater spirituality. In a more cynical context, asceticism may connote some form of self-mortification, ritual punishment of the body, or harsh renunciation of pleasure, though the word itself does not necessarily imply a negative connotation.
ascriptivism
The view that human beings are to be held responsible for their actions even if determinism is true.
associationalism
A political project where "human welfare and liberty are both best served when as many of the affairs of a society as possible are managed by voluntary and democratically self-governing associations". Associationalism "gives priority to freedom in its scale of values, but it contends that such freedom can only be pursued effectively if individuals join with their fellows"
atheism
The absence of belief in the existence of any deity, thus contrasting with theism; a condition of being without theistic beliefs. This definition includes both those who assert that there are no gods and those who maintain no beliefs at all regarding the existence of gods. However, narrower definitions often only qualify the former as atheism, with the latter falling under the more general (but rarely used) term nontheism.
atomism
The theory that all objects in the Universe are composed of very small, indestructible elements called atoms. (This is the case for the Western [i.e., Greek] theories of atomism. Buddhists also have well-developed theories of atomism, which involve momentary, or non-eternal, atoms, that flash in and out of existence).
authoritarianism
An organization or a state that enforces strong, and sometimes oppressive measures against those in its sphere of influence, generally without attempts at gaining their consent and often not allowing feedback on its policies. In an authoritarian state, citizens are subject to state authority in many aspects of their lives, including many that other political philosophies would see as matters of personal choice. There are various degrees of authoritarianism; even very democratic and liberal states will show authoritarianism to some extent, for example in areas of national security.
automatism

An artistic technique of spontaneous writing, drawing, or the like that is practiced without conscious aesthetic or moral self-censorship.

== B ==
behavioralism
An approach in political science that seeks to provide an objective, quantified approach to explaining and predicting political behavior. It is associated with the rise of the behavioral sciences, modeled after the natural sciences. It should not be confused with the behaviorism of psychology.
behaviorism
An approach to psychology based on the proposition that behavior can be researched scientifically without recourse to inner mental states. It is a form of materialism, denying any independent significance for the mind. Its significance for psychological treatment has been profound, making it one of the pillars of pharmacological therapy. It should not be confused with the behavioralism of political science.
biologism

The interpretation of humans and human life from a strictly biological point of view. It is closely related to and often used interchangeably with genetic determinism.
Buddhism
A dharmic religion and philosophy based on the teachings of the Buddha, Siddhārtha Gautama. The basic teachings of Buddhism have to do with the nature of suffering or dissatisfaction (dukkha) and its overcoming through ethical principles, meditation and wisdom (the Eightfold Path). Buddhism originated in India, and is today largely followed in Southeast and East Asia, including China, Japan, Korea, Tibet, Sri Lanka, Myanmar and Thailand. Buddhism is divided into different sects and movements, of which the largest are the Theravada, Mahayana, and Vajrayana.

== C ==
capitalism
An economic system in which all or most of the means of production are privately owned and operated (usually through employing wage labour, and for profit), and in which the investment of capital and the production, distribution and prices of commodities and services are determined mainly in a free market. Capitalism has also been called laissez-faire economy, free market economy, free enterprise system, economic liberalism, and economic individualism.
cardiocentrism
A philosophy that argues that the heart is the primary location of human emotions, cognition, and awareness, as opposed to Cephalocentrism
careerism
The desire to advance one's own career as a sole aim in life, often at the expense of personal and social growth or development.
Cartesianism
A philosophy based on the ideas and works of the French philosopher René Descartes.
Cephalocentrism
The ancient Greek doctrine, originating with Alcmaeon of Croton, that the brain is the seat of the mind, sensation and cognition, as opposed to cardiocentrism.
Christian existential humanism
A philosophy that argues that humans can make choices based on free will through Christ's teachings.
Christian existentialism
The philosophical movement shares similar views to existentialism with the added idea that the Judeo-Christian-Islamic God plays an important part in coping with the underlying themes of human existence.
Christian humanism
A philosophy in which human freedom and individualism are compatible with the practice of Christianity or intrinsic in its doctrine. It is a combination of humanist and Christian values.
Christian materialism
The philosophical view that the only thing that can truly be said to 'exist' is matter due to the teachings of Christ.
Christianism
Another name for Christianity, the monotheistic religion recognizing Jesus Christ as its founder and central figure. With more than two billion adherents, or about one-third of the total world population, it is the largest world religion. Its origins are intertwined with Judaism, with which it shares much sacred lore, including the Old Testament (Hebrew Bible). Christianity is sometimes termed an Abrahamic religion, along with Judaism and Islam.
classical theism
Traditional ideas of the monotheistic religions such as Judaism, Christianity, and Islam. Classical theism holds that God is an absolute, eternal, all-knowing (omniscient), all-powerful (omnipotent), and perfect being. God is related to the world as its cause, but is unaffected by the world (immutable). He is transcendent over the world, which exists relative to him as a temporal effect.
Classicism
In the arts, a high regard for classical antiquity, as setting standards for taste that the classicist seeks to emulate. Classicism is usually contrasted with Romanticism; the art of classicism typically seeks to be formal, restrained, and Apollonian (nothing in excess) rather than Dionysiac (excessive), in Friedrich Nietzsche's opposition. It can also refer to the other periods of classicism. In theater, Classicism was developed by 17th century French playwrights from what they judged to be the rules of Greek classical theater, including the Classical unities of time, place and action.
cognitivism
1. In ethics, cognitivism is the philosophical view that ethical sentences express propositions, and hence are capable of being true or false. More generally, cognitivism with respect to any area of discourse is the position that sentences used in that discourse are cognitive, that is, are meaningful and capable of being true or false.
2. In psychology, cognitivism is the approach to understanding the mind that argues that mental function can be understood as the 'internal' rule bound manipulation of symbols. See Cognitivism (psychology).
coherentism
There are two distinct types of coherentism. One refers to the coherence theory of truth, which restricts true sentences to those that cohere with some specified set of sentences. Someone's belief is true if and only if it is coherent with all or most of their other beliefs. Usually, coherence is taken to imply something stronger than mere consistency. Statements that are comprehensive and meet the requirements of Occam's razor are usually to be preferred. The second type of coherentism is the belief in the coherence theory of justification, an epistemological theory opposing foundationalism and offering a solution to the regress argument. In this epistemological capacity, it is a theory about how belief can be justified.
Colbertism
A variation of mercantilism which was applied in France between 1661 and 1683 by the superintendent of Finances Jean-Baptiste Colbert.
collectivism
A theoretical or practical emphasis on the group, as opposed to (and seen by many of its opponents to be at the expense of) the individual. Some psychologists define collectivism as a syndrome of attitudes and behaviors based on the belief that the basic unit of survival lies within a group, not the individual. Collectivists typically hold that the "greater good" of the group, is more important than the good of any particular individual who is one part of that larger organization. Some collectivists argue that the individual incidentally serves his own interests by working for the benefit of the group.
Communal (disambiguation)
Outside of South Asia, communalism involves a broad range of social movements and social theories in some way centered upon the community. Communalism can take the form of communal living or communal property, among others. It is sometimes said to put the interests of the community above the interests of the individual, but this is usually only done on the principle that the community exists for the benefit of the individuals who participate in it, so the best way to serve the interests of the individual is through the interests of the community.
communism
A theoretical system of social organization and a political movement based on common ownership of the means of production. As a political movement, communism seeks to establish a classless society. A major force in world politics since the early 20th century, modern communism is generally associated with The Communist Manifesto of Karl Marx and Friedrich Engels, according to which the capitalist profit-based system of private ownership is replaced by a communist society in which the means of production are communally owned, such as through a gift economy. Often this process is said initiated by the revolutionary overthrow of the bourgeoisie (see Marxism), passes through a transitional period marked by the preparatory stage of socialism (see Leninism). Pure communism has never been implemented, it remains theoretical: communism is, in Marxist theory, the end-state, or the result of state-socialism. The word is now mainly understood to refer to the political, economic, and social theory of Marxist thinkers, or life under conditions of Communist party rule.
communitarianism
A group of related but distinct philosophies that began in the late 20th century, opposing aspects of liberalism and capitalism while advocating phenomena such as civil society. Not necessarily hostile to liberalism in the contemporary American sense of the word, communitarianism rather has a different emphasis, shifting the focus of interest toward communities and societies and away from the individual. The question of priority (individual or community) often has the largest impact in the most pressing ethical questions: health care, abortion, multiculturalism, hate speech, and so on.
compatibilism
Also known as "soft determinism" and championed by David Hume, is a theory that holds that free will and determinism are compatible. According to Hume, free will should not be understood as an absolute ability to have chosen differently under exactly the same inner and outer circumstances. Rather, it is a hypothetical ability to have chosen differently if one had been differently psychologically disposed by some different beliefs or desires. Hume also maintains that free acts are not uncaused (or mysteriously self-caused as Immanuel Kant would have it) but caused by people's choices as determined by their beliefs, desires, and by their characters. While a decision making process exists in Hume's determinism, this process is governed by a causal chain of events.
Comtism
Auguste Comte's positivistic philosophy that metaphysics and theology should be replaced by a hierarchy of sciences from mathematics at the base to sociology at the top.
conceptualism
A doctrine in philosophy intermediate between nominalism and realism, that universals exist only within the mind and have no external or substantial reality.
Consciousness
sentience or awareness of internal and external existence.
Confucianism
An East Asian ethical and philosophical system originally developed from the teachings of the early Chinese sage Confucius. It is a complex system of moral, social, political, and religious thought that has had tremendous influence on the history of Chinese civilization down to the 21st century. Some have considered it to have been the "state religion" of imperial China.
consequentialism
The belief that what ultimately matters in evaluating actions or policies of action are the consequences that result from choosing one action or policy rather than the alternative.
constructivism
The view that reality, or at least humans' knowledge of it, is a value-laden subjective construction rather than a passive acquisition of objective features.
consumerism
Attachment to material values or possessions.
contextualism
A collection of views that emphasize the context in which an action, utterance or expression occurs, and argues that, in some important respect, the action, utterance or expression can only be understood within that context. Contextualist views hold that philosophically controversial concepts, such as "meaning P", "knowing that P", "having a reason to A", and possibly even "being true" or "being right" only have meaning relative to a specified context. Some philosophers hold that context-dependence may lead to relativism; nevertheless, contextualist views are increasingly popular within philosophy.
conventionalism
The philosophical attitude which holds that fundamental principles of a certain kind are grounded on (explicit or implicit) agreements in society, rather than on external reality. Although this attitude is commonly held with respect to the rules of grammar and the principles of etiquette, its application to the propositions of law, ethics, science, mathematics, and logic is more controversial.
cosmotheism
Another name for pantheism.
creationism

The belief that humans, life, the Earth, and the Universe were created by the supernatural intervention of a creator deity. This intervention may be seen either as an act of creation from nothing (ex nihilo) or the emergence of order from pre-existing chaos.
critical rationalism
The philosophy that tenets of science should always be criticized and questioned so as to continually prove their worth.
critical realism
a view that certain types of sense data accurately represent a mind-independent reality while other types do not. A key example is the primary/secondary quality distinction.
cynicism
Originally the philosophy of a group of ancient Greeks called the Cynics, founded by Antisthenes. Nowadays the word generally refers to the opinions of those inclined to disbelieve in human sincerity, in virtue, or in altruism: individuals who maintain that only self-interest motivates human behavior. A modern cynic typically has a highly contemptuous attitude towards social norms, especially those that serve more of a ritualistic purpose than a practical one, and will tend to dismiss a substantial proportion of popular beliefs, conventional morality, and accepted wisdom as obsolete or irrelevant nonsense.

== D ==
Darwinism
The theory of biological evolution developed by English naturalist Charles Darwin (1809–1882) and others, stating that all species of organisms arise and develop through the natural selection of small, inherited variations that increase the individual's ability to compete, survive, and reproduce. See also History of evolutionary thought.
day-age creationism
A type of Old Earth creationism, it is an effort to reconcile Creation as presented in Genesis with modern scientific theories on the age of the Universe. It holds that the six days referred to in Genesis are not ordinary 24-hour days, but are much longer periods, thus interpreting Genesis as cosmic evolution.
deconstructionism
A school and a set of methods of textual criticism aimed at understanding the assumptions and ideas that form the basis for thought and belief. Also called "deconstruction", its central concern is a radical critique of the metaphysics of the Western philosophical tradition, in which it identifies a logicentrism or "metaphysics of presence" which holds that speech-thought (the logos) is a privileged, ideal, and self-present entity, through which all discourse and meaning derive. This logocentrism is the primary target of deconstruction.
deductivism
A philosophy that holds that scientific inquiry proceeds by formulating a hypothesis in a form that could conceivably be falsified by a test on observable data.
defeatism
The acceptance of and contentedness with defeat without struggle. In everyday use, defeatism has negative connotation, and is often linked to treason and pessimism. The term is commonly used in the context of war: a soldier can be a defeatist if he or she refuses to fight because he or she thinks that the fight will be lost for sure or that it is not worth fighting for some other reason. The term can also be used in other fields, like politics, sports, psychology and philosophy.
deism
The view that reason, rather than revelation or tradition, should be the basis of belief in God. Deists reject both organized and revealed religion and maintain that reason is the essential element in all knowledge. For a "rational basis for religion" they refer to the cosmological argument (first cause argument), the teleological argument (argument from design), and other aspects of what was called natural religion. Deism has become identified with the classical belief that God created but does not intervene in the world, though this is not a necessary component of deism. A form of monotheism in which it is believed that one god exists. However, a deist rejects the idea that this god intervenes in the world. Hence any notion of special revelation is impossible, and the nature of god can only be known through reason and observation from nature. A deist thus rejects the miraculous, and the claim to knowledge made for religious groups and texts.
democratic transhumanism
A transhumanist philosophy that is generally socially progressive. It also encompasses radical democratic political views.
deontologism
An ethical theory considered solely on duty and rights, where one has an unchanging moral obligation to abide by a set of defined principles. Thus, the ends of any action never justify the means in this ethical system. If someone were to do their moral duty, then it would not matter if that duty had negative consequences. Because of this reasoning, consequentialism is sometimes considered the philosophical antithesis of deontologism.
descriptivism

A view of the nature of the meaning and reference of proper names, generally attributed to Gottlob Frege and Bertrand Russell. The theory consists essentially of the idea that the meanings of names are identical to the descriptions associated with them by speakers, while their referents are determined to be the objects that satisfy these descriptions.
determinism
The philosophical proposition that every event, including human cognition, decision, and action, is causally determined by an unbroken chain of prior occurrences.
dialectical materialism
The view that ideas and arguments can only exist as matter and that the subconscious protohuman does not exist. It is often considered the philosophical basis of Marxism.
dialetheism
A metaphysical doctrine according to which there are true contradictions.
disjunctivism
A direct realist view that rejects the existence of some sense data.
distributism
A cooperative economic theory in which productive property is distributed among all individuals, rather than being held by the state or in common (as in socialism) or by the few (as in capitalism).
dogma
A belief or doctrine or philosophical position established by a religion, ideology, philosophical movement, or any kind of organization held to be authoritative and above dispute or doubt such that it is not to be diverged from. A dogmatic position is "established" only according to a particular point of view, and therefore of doubtful foundation.
dualism
A set of beliefs that begins with the claim that the mental and the physical have a fundamentally different nature. It is contrasted with varying kinds of monism, including materialism and phenomenalism. Dualism is one answer to the mind-body problem. Pluralism holds that there are even more kinds of events or things in the world.
dynamism
A cosmological framework developed by Gottfried Leibniz (1646–1716). The idea behind Dynamism in metaphysical cosmology is that the material world can be explained in terms of active, point-like forces, with no extension but with action at a distance. Dynamism describes that which exists as simple elements, or for Leibniz, Monads, and groups of elements that have only the essence of forces. It was developed as a reaction against the passive view of matter in philosophical mechanism.

== E ==
eclecticism
A conceptual approach that does not hold rigidly to a single paradigm or set of assumptions, but instead draws upon multiple theories, styles, or ideas to gain complementary insights into a subject, or applies different theories in particular cases.
egalitarianism
A political doctrine that holds that all people should be treated as equals.
egoism
Either a descriptive theory that maintains all conscious acts ultimately concern promoting one's self-interest, or a normative theory that maintains one should pursue one's self-interest.
eliminative materialism
An absolute version of materialism and physicalism with respect to mental entities and mental vocabulary, according to which humans' common-sense understanding of the mind (what eliminativists call folk psychology) is not a viable theory on which to base scientific investigation: behaviour and experience can only be adequately explained on the biological level. Therefore, no coherent neural basis will be found for everyday folk psychological concepts (such as belief, desire and intention, for they are illusory and therefore do not have any consistent neurological substrate. Eliminative materialists therefore believe that consciousness does not exist except as an epiphenomenon of brain function and some believe that the concept will eventually be eliminated as neuroscience progresses.
emanationism
The belief that reality necessarily proceeds from a first principle.
emergent materialism
The philosophy that asserts that the mind is an irreducible existent in some sense, albeit not in the sense of being an ontological simple, and that the study of mental phenomena is independent of other sciences.
emotionalism
An inclination to rely on or place focus on emotion.
emotivism
The non-cognitivist meta-ethical theory that ethical judgments are primarily expressions of one's own attitude and imperatives meant to change the attitudes and actions of another. It is heavily associated with the work of A. J. Ayer and C. L. Stevenson, and it is related to the prescriptivism of R. M. Hare.
empiricism
The doctrine that all knowledge ultimately comes from experience, denying the notion of innate ideas or a priori knowledge about the world. It is opposed with rationalism.
enlightened absolutism
A form of governing by rulers who were influenced by the Enlightenment (18th-century and early 19th-century Europe).
environmentalism
A concern for the preservation, restoration, or improvement of the natural environment, such as the conservation of natural resources, prevention of pollution, and certain land use actions. It often supports the struggles of indigenous peoples against the spread of globalization to their way of life, which is seen as less harmful to the environment.
Epicureanism
While often considered to be the philosophy of pleasure seeking, in fact refers to a middle-path philosophy defining happiness as success in avoiding pain, in the form of both mental worry and physical discomfort, in order to produce a state of tranquility.
epistemology
A term first used by the Scottish philosopher James Frederick Ferrier to describe the branch of philosophy concerned with the nature and scope of knowledge; it is also referred to as "theory of knowledge". Put concisely, it is the study of knowledge and justified belief. It questions what knowledge is and how it can be acquired, and the extent to which knowledge pertinent to any given subject or entity can be acquired. Much of the debate in this field has focused on the philosophical analysis of the nature of knowledge and how it relates to connected notions such as truth, belief, and justification. The term was probably first introduced in Ferrier's Institutes of Metaphysic: The Theory of Knowing and Being (1854), p. 46.
epiphenomenalism
The view in philosophy of mind according to which physical events have mental effects, but mental events have no effects of any kind. In other words, the causal relations go only one way, from physical to mental. In recent times it is usually considered a type of dualism, because it postulates physical events but also non-physical mental events; but historically it has sometimes been thought a kind of monism, because of its sharp divergence from substance dualism.
equalitarianism
Another name for egalitarianism.
essentialism
The belief and practice centered on a philosophical claim that for any specific kind of entity it is at least theoretically possible to specify a finite list of characteristics, all of which any entity must have to belong to the group defined.
eternalism
A philosophical approach to the ontological nature of time. It builds on the standard method of modeling time as a dimension in physics, to give time a similar ontology to that of space. This would mean that time is just another dimension, that future events are "already there", and that there is no objective flow of time.
ethical egoism
The normative ethical position that moral agents ought to do what is in their own self-interest. It is distinguished from psychological egoism and rational egoism. It contrasts with ethical altruism, which holds that moral agents have an ethical obligation to help or serve others. Ethical egoism does not, however, require moral agents to disregard the well-being of others, nor does it require that a moral agent refrains from considering the well-being of others in moral deliberation. What is in an agent's self-interest may be incidentally detrimental to, beneficial to, or neutral in its effect on others. It allows for the possibility of either as long as what is chosen is efficacious in satisfying self-interest of the agent. Ethical egoism is sometimes used to support libertarianism or anarchism, political positions based partly on a belief that individuals should not coercively prevent others from exercising freedom of action.
ethnocentrism
The tendency to look at the world primarily from the perspective of one's own culture. It is defined as the viewpoint that "one's own group is the center of everything (better than all other cultures)," against which all other groups are judged. Ethnocentrism often entails the belief that one's own race or ethnic group is the most important and/or that some or all aspects of its culture are superior to those of other groups.
eudaimonism
A system of ethics that evaluates actions in terms of their capacity to produce happiness.
evolutionary creationism
A lesser used term for theistic evolution, the general opinion that some or all classical religious teachings about creation and its creator are compatible with some or all of the modern scientific understanding about biological evolution. Theistic evolution is not a theory in the scientific sense, but a particular view about how the science of evolution relates to some religious interpretations.
existentialism
The philosophical movement that views human existence as having a set of underlying themes and characteristics, such as anxiety, dread, freedom, awareness of death, and consciousness of existing, that are primary. That is, they cannot be reduced to or explained by a natural-scientific approach or any approach that attempts to detach itself from or rise above these themes.
experientialism
The philosophy that knowledge is to be measured according to experiences and firsthand accounts.
experimentalism
A philosophy that uses data obtained from experiments in order to ascertain the integrity of an idea or proposed concept.
Expressionism
An aesthetic and artistic movement that distorted reality for enhanced or exaggerated emotional effect. It can also apply to some literature; the works of Franz Kafka and Georg Kaiser are often said to be expressionistic, for example.
expressivism
A theory about the meaning of moral language. According to expressivism, sentences that employ moral terms–for example, "It is wrong to torture an innocent human being"–are not descriptive or fact-stating; moral terms such as "wrong," "good," or "just" do not refer to real, in-the-world properties. The primary function of moral sentences, according to expressivism, is not to assert any matter of fact, but rather to express an evaluative attitude toward an object of evaluation. Because the function of moral language is non-descriptive, moral sentences do not have any truth conditions. Hence, expressivists either do not allow that moral sentences have truth value, or rely on a notion of truth value that does not appeal to any descriptive truth conditions being met for moral sentences.
externalism
In epistemology, the theory that justification can hold elements not known to the subject of the belief.
externism
A pseudo-philosophical theory developed by fictitious genius Jára Cimrman. It deals with people's knowledge and learning process.
extropianism

An evolving framework of values and standards for continuously improving the human condition, originated by Max More. Extropianism describes a pragmatic consilience of transhuman thought guided by a conscious, pro-active, self-directed approach to human evolution and progress. See posthuman. Extropians were once concisely described as libertarian transhumanists, and some still hold to this standard.

== F ==
fallibilism
The doctrine that absolute certainty about knowledge is impossible, or at least that all claims to knowledge could, in principle, be mistaken. As a formal doctrine, it is most strongly associated with Charles Sanders Peirce, who used it in his attack on foundationalism. Unlike skepticism, fallibilism does not imply the need for humans to abandon their knowledge: humans need not have logically conclusive justifications for what they know. Rather, it is an admission that because empirical knowledge can be revised by further observation, all knowledge, excepting that which is axiomatically true (such as mathematical and logical knowledge) exists in a constant state of flux.
falsifiability
The idea that a proposition or theory cannot be scientific if it does not admit the possibility of being shown to be false. For example, the proposition "All crows are black" is a scientific proposition because it can be falsified by the observation of one white crow.
fascism
A political ideology and mass movement that seeks to place the nation, defined in exclusive biological, cultural, and historical terms, above all other loyalties, and to create a mobilized national community. Many different characteristics are attributed to fascism by different scholars, but the following elements are usually seen as its integral parts: nationalism, authoritarianism, militarism, corporatism, totalitarianism, collectivism, anti-liberalism, and anti-communism.
feminism
A diverse collection of social theories, political movements, and moral philosophies, largely motivated by or concerning the experiences of women, especially in terms of their social, political, and economic situation. As a social movement, feminism largely focuses on limiting or eradicating gender inequality and promoting women's rights, interests, and issues in society.
fatalism
The view that human deliberation and actions are pointless and ineffectual in determining events, because whatever will be will be. One ancient argument, called the idle argument, went like this: "If it is fated for you to recover from your illness, then you will recover whether you call a doctor or not. Likewise, if you are fated not to recover, you will not do so even if you call a doctor. So, calling a doctor makes no difference." Arguments like this are usually rejected even by causal determinists, who may say that it may be determined that only a doctor can cure you.
fideism
In Christian theology, the position that reason is more-or-less irrelevant to religious belief, that rational or scientific arguments for the existence of God are fallacious and irrelevant, and have nothing to do with the truth of Christian theology. Its argument in essence goes: "Christian theology teaches that people are saved by faith. But, if God's existence can be proven, either empirically or logically, faith becomes irrelevant. Therefore, if Christian theology is true, no proof of God's existence is possible." The term is occasionally used to refer to a belief that Christians are saved by faith alone: for which see sola fide. This position is sometimes called solifidianism.
finalism
The philosophy that any event is defined by an already-set final outcome and that all events leading up to that outcome are shaped by the end result.
formalism
1. A certain school in the philosophy of mathematics, stressing axiomatic proofs through theorems specifically associated with David Hilbert.
2. A school of thought in law and jurisprudence that emphasises the fairness of process over substantive outcomes. See Legal formalism.
3. In economic anthropology, the theoretical perspective that the principles of neoclassical economics can be applied to humans' understanding of all human societies.
4. A certain rigorous mathematical method: see formal system.
5. A set of notations and rules for manipulating them that yield results in agreement with experiment or other techniques of calculation. These rules and notations may or may not have a corresponding mathematical semantics. In the case no mathematical semantics exists, the calculations are often said to be purely formal. See for example scientific formalism.
6. A style of literary and artistic criticism that focuses on artistic or literary techniques in themselves, in separation from the work's social and historical context. See formalism (art), formalism (literature).
7. A style of film criticism that focuses on the technical aspects of filmmaking (e.g., lighting, sets, costumes, etc.). The term may also refer to an avant-garde experimental film movement, often seen as odd or extremist, that was concerned with the beauty of the actual physical form of film (i.e., the celluloid itself).
foundationalism
Any justification or knowledge theory in epistemology that holds that beliefs are justified (known) when they are based on basic beliefs (also called foundational beliefs). Basic beliefs are beliefs that are self-justifying or self-evident, and don't need to be justified by other beliefs. Basic beliefs provide justificatory support to other beliefs, which can in turn support further derivative beliefs. Foundationalists hold that basic beliefs are justified by mental events or states (such as experiences) that do not constitute beliefs (these are called nondoxastic mental states), or that they simply are not the type of thing that can (or needs to be) justified.
French materialism
The philosophy that holds that both the associationist psychology and empiricism of John Locke with the totality of Isaac Newton are correct and compatible with each other.
Freudianism
The beliefs and practice of psychoanalysis as devised by Sigmund Freud; particularly, the mechanism of psychological repression; the situation of sexual desire as central to the development of the persona; and the efficacy of the "talking cure" or psychoanalytic technique.
functionalism
The dominant theory of mental states in modern philosophy. Functionalism was developed as an answer to the mind-body problem because of objections to both identity theory and logical behaviorism. Its core idea is that the mental states can be accounted for without taking into account the underlying physical medium (the neurons), instead attending to higher-level functions such as beliefs, desires, and emotions.

== G ==
gap creationism

A particular set of Christian beliefs about the creation of the Universe and the origin of man. The concept of the Gap Theory is widely thought to have been promulgated by William Buckland and Thomas Chalmers in the early 19th century, though some adherents maintain that it can be traced back to biblical times. Certainly it became quite popular when it was promoted by the Scofield Reference Bible in 1909.
German idealism
A movement in idealism centered in Germany and traditionally beginning with Immanuel Kant's notion of transcendental idealism. Many prominent exponents include Georg Wilhelm Friedrich Hegel, Johann Gottlieb Fichte, and Friedrich Wilhelm Joseph Schelling.
Global Estate
The term, coined by Kimberly L. Hammersmith in 2015, which embodies the cumulative experiences, and physical and metaphysical wealth and resources of the collective being - meant to define its relevant function in scope and depth.
Gnosticism
Any of various mystical initiatory religions, sects and knowledge schools which were most prominent in the first few centuries CE. It is also applied to modern revivals of these groups and, sometimes, by analogy to all religious movements based on secret knowledge gnosis.
greedy reductionism
This term was coined by Daniel Dennett to condemn those forms of reductionism that try to explain too much with too little.

== H ==
hedonism
The ethical view that pleasure is the greatest good, and that pleasure should be the standard in deciding which course of action to pursue. Hedonism is usually associated with a more physical, egoistic, or unrefined definition of "pleasure" than that found in the related doctrine of utilitarianism. The term may also refer to the descriptive view that people are primarily motivated by seeking pleasure and avoiding pain.
Hegelianism
A philosophy developed by Georg Wilhelm Friedrich Hegel. It is sometimes summarized by one of Hegel's sayings: "The rational alone is real," meaning that all reality is capable of being expressed in rational categories. Hegel's goal was to reduce to a more synthetic unity the system of transcendental idealism.
henotheism
Devotion to a single god while accepting the existence of other gods. Coined by Max Müller, according to whom it is "monotheism in principle and a polytheism in fact". Variations on the term have been inclusive monotheism and monarchial polytheism, designed to differentiate differing forms of the phenomenon.
hereditarianism
The philosophy developed by Francis Galton and expressed in his book Hereditary Genius in 1869 that people inherit mental characteristics from their parents such as personality and intelligence, a component of "nature" in the phrase "nature and nurture." Galton's view was opposed by Lamarckism but the development of human behavior genetics helped confirm hereditarianism as a partial explanation of human individual differences.
Hinduism
Arguably the oldest extant religion in the world.
historical determinism
The philosophical proposition that events in history were determined by a series of occurrences previous to the event.
historical materialism
The methodological approach to the study of society, economics, and history first articulated by Karl Marx. His fundamental proposition of historical materialism can be summed up in the following: It is not the consciousness of men that determines their existence, but their social existence that determines their consciousness. — Karl Marx, Preface to A Contribution to the Critique of Political Economy Historical materialism looks for the causes of developments and changes in human societies in the way humans collectively make the means to live, thus giving an emphasis, through economic analysis, to everything that co-exists with the economic base of society (e.g. social classes, political structures, and ideologies).
historicism
The theory that claims that: 1) that there is an organic succession of developments (also known as historism or the German historismus), and 2) that local conditions and peculiarities influence the results in a decisive way. It can be contrasted with reductionist theories that suppose that all developments can be explained by fundamental principles (such as in economic determinism).
holism
The idea that all the properties of a given system cannot be determined or explained by the sum of its constituent parts alone. Instead, the system as a whole determines in an important way how the parts behave. The general principle of holism is concisely summarized by the phrase "The whole is more than the sum of its parts." Holism is often seen as the opposite of reductionism.
humanism
The range of ethical views that consider human nature to be the source of values.
humanistic naturalism
The belief that human beings, as well as plants and animals, are divine and intricate extensions of nature. Followers share a mutual respect for things created directly by nature, even though life must feed upon life for continuance. While most believers are able to adapt to modern change, naturalists prefer the fair exchange of resources, as was in the case of former agricultural and hunter-gatherer societies. Industry and technology are in exact opposition to naturalism.
hylozoism
The philosophical conjecture that all or some material things possess life, or that all life is inseparable from matter.

== I ==
idealism
The doctrine that reality or knowledge is founded on ideas (mental experience). Depending on the specific ideal, idealism is usually juxtaposed with materialism or realism.
ignosticism
A philosophy questioning the existence of a supreme deity relating to a lack of proof while at the same time arguing for a strong faith.
illusionism
A philosophy that holds that there is no material world but rather a collection of illusions formed by human consciousness that results in an environment for all humans to live in.
immaterialism
A philosophy that holds that there are no material objects, but rather that all reality is a construct of a flawed perception.
immoralism
The philosophy that man should try to strive for the perfect aesthetic of eternal life.
immortalism
The concept of existing for a potentially infinite, or indeterminate length, of time. Throughout history, humans have had the desire to live forever. What form an unending or indefinitely long human life would take, or whether it is even possible, has been the subject of much speculation, fantasy, and debate.
incompatibilism
The belief that free will and determinism are not logically compatible categories. Contrast compatibilism.
indeterminism
The philosophical belief contradictory to determinism: that there are events that do not correspond with determinism (and therefore are uncaused in some sense).
individualism
In political philosophy, the view that the rights or well-being of individuals are to be protected rather than the rights or well-being of groups such as nations or states, ideologies (such as communism or democracy), or religious communities (such as Christendom). Individualism is often associated with classical liberalism and opposed to the various sorts of communalism and nationalism.
inductionism
The scientific philosophy by which scientific laws can be "induced" from sets of data. As an example, one might measure the strength of electrical forces at varying distances from charges and induce the inverse square law of electrostatics. See also inductive reasoning.
inductivism
The philosophy that holds that scientific research is guided by the various observations and data produced by previous science experiments; In other words, that science progresses in a direction that has prior experimental data. It exists both in a classical naive version, which has been highly influential, and in various more sophisticated versions. The naive version, which trace back to thinkers such as Abū Rayhān al-Bīrūnī and David Hume, says that general statements (theories) have to be based on empirical observations, which are subsequently generalized into statements that can be regarded as true or probably true.
infinitism
The view that knowledge may be justified by an infinite chain of reasons.
innatism
The doctrine that holds that the mind is born with ideas or knowledge, and is not merely a "blank slate" at birth as early empiricists such as John Locke claimed. It asserts that not all knowledge is obtained from experience and the senses.
instrumentalism
The idea that knowledge should be judged by its usefulness and that the truth-value of knowledge is irrelevant. Generally invoked in philosophy of science.
intellectualism
The doctrine about the possibility of deriving knowledge from reason alone, intellectualism can stand for a general approach emphasising the importance of learning and logical thinking. Criticism of this attitude, sometimes summed up as Left Bank, caricatures intellectualism's faith in the mind and puts it in opposition to emotion, instinct, and primitivist values in general.
internalism
In epistemology, the view that all evidence involved in justification must be knowable to the subject.
intentionalism
A philosophy that questions the underpinnings of original intent and explores whether or not humans are the source of their own actions or are controlled by a higher power.
interactionism
A philosophy that explores the relationship between cause and effect in regards to the human perception of the Universe.
interbehaviorism
Founded by Jacob Robert Kantor before Skinner's writings and currently worked by L. Hayes; E. Ribes; and S. Bijou. centered in the inter behavior of organisms, field theory of behavior; emphasis on human behavior.
interpretivism
In epistemology, the view that all knowledge is a matter of interpretation.
legal interpretivism
A school of thought in the philosophy of law, in which law is not considered to be a set of data or physical facts, but what lawyers aim to construct. It holds that there is no separation between law and morality although there are differences (this is the opposite of the main claim of legal positivism). According to legal interpretivism, law is not immanent in nature nor do legal values and principles exist independently and outside of the legal practice itself (this is the opposite of the main claim of natural law theory).
intrinsicism
A philosophy that holds that the intrinsic value of an object cannot be judged by humans.
intuitionism
In the philosophy of mathematics, intuitionism, or neointuitionism (opposed to preintuitionism), is an approach to mathematics as the constructive mental activity of humans. That is, mathematics does not consist of analytic activities wherein deep properties of existence are revealed and applied. Instead, logic and mathematics are the application of internally consistent methods to realize more complex mental constructs.
irrationalism
A philosophy that claims that science is inferior to intuition, with art and the conquest of the aesthetic being the ultimate transcendence of the human condition.
irrealism
A philosophy combining the phenomenalism and physicalism in epistemology with the view that either could be used interchangeably as agents of free will and study of the aesthetic.
Islamism
A set of political ideologies derived from various religious views of Muslim fundamentalists, which hold that Islam is not only a religion but also a political system that governs the legal, economic, and social imperatives of the state. Islamist movements seek to re-shape the state by implementing a conservative formulation of Sharia law. Islamists regard themselves as Muslims rather than Islamists, while moderate Muslims reject this notion.

== J ==
Jainism
A dharmic religion centered around asceticism and ahimsa, or nonviolence.
Jansenism
A branch of Catholic thought that emphasized original sin, human depravity, the necessity of divine grace, and predestination. Named after Cornelius Otto Jansen.
Judaism
A monotheistic Abrahamic religion descended from the ancient Hebrews.

== K ==
Kantianism
The philosophy of Immanuel Kant, a German philosopher born in Königsberg, Germany (now Kaliningrad, Russia). The terms Kantianism or Kantian can refer to contemporary positions in philosophy of mind, epistemology, and ethics.
kathenotheism
An extension of henotheism, from kath hena theon – "one god at a time".
Kierkegaardianism
A set of philosophical, theological, and psychological positions based on the work of the 19th-century Danish philosopher Søren Kierkegaard. Kierkegaard's work focuses on the existing individual and the struggle to become an authentic individual. Kierkegaard's work was among the most important intellectual foundations for the 20th-century philosophical movement known as existentialism.

== L ==
legalism
In the Western sense, an approach to the analysis of legal questions characterized by abstract "logical" reasoning focused on the applicable legal text, such as a constitution, legislation, or case law, rather than on the social, economic, or political context. Legalism has occurred both in civil and common law traditions. Legalism may endorse the notion that the pre-existing body of authoritative legal materials already contains a uniquely pre-determined "right answer" to any legal problem that may arise. In legalism, the task of the judge is to ascertain the answer to a legal question mechanically.
legal interpretivism
See interpretivism.
legal naturalism
A term coined by Olufemi Taiwo for a current in the social philosophy of Karl Marx that can be interpreted as one of Natural Law. Taiwo considered it the manifestation of Natural Law in a dialectical materialist context.
legal positivism
A school of thought in the philosophy of law that claims that laws are made (deliberately or unintentionally) by human beings, and that there is no inherent or necessary connection between the validity of law and what is ethical or moral.
liberalism
In politics, a position that favors liberty as a political value. Liberalism has taken many meanings throughout history, but commonalities include a focus on individual liberty, democratic republicanism (liberal democracy), and equality under the law.
libertarianism
1. In metaphysics, the claim that free will exists. In this sense it is generally opposed to determinism (but see compatibilism).
2. In political philosophy, either of two anti-statist political positions.
linguistic relativism
The idea that differences in language are related to differences in cognition of the language users. It is an idea inferred from linguistic determinism, and subject in the Sapir–Whorf hypothesis.
logical atomism
Bertrand Russell developed logical atomism in an attempt to identify the atoms of thought – pieces of thought that cannot be divided into smaller pieces of thought.
logical behaviorism
Established by Oxford philosopher Gilbert Ryle in his book The Concept of Mind (1949).
logical positivism

A philosophy of science originating in the Vienna Circle in the 1920s which holds that philosophy should aspire to the same sort of rigor as science. Logical positivism asserts that philosophy should provide strict criteria for judging sentences true, false, and meaningless. Although the logical positivists held a wide range of beliefs on many matters, they all shared an interest in science and deep skepticism of the theological and metaphysical. Following Ludwig Wittgenstein, many subscribed to the correspondence theory of truth, although some, like Neurath, believed in coherentism. They believed that all knowledge should be based on logical inference from simple "protocol sentences" grounded in observable facts. Hence many supported forms of realism, materialism, philosophical naturalism, and empiricism.
logicism
A school of thought in the philosophy of mathematics, putting forth the theory that mathematics is an extension of logic and therefore all mathematics is reducible to logic. Bertrand Russell and Alfred North Whitehead championed this theory fathered by Gottlob Frege. Frege gave up on the project after Russell recognized a paradox exposing an inconsistency in naive set theory. Russell and Whitehead continued on with the project in their Principia Mathematica.

== M ==
Manichaeism
One of the major ancient religions. Though its organized form is mostly extinct today, a revival has been attempted under the name of neo-Manichaeism. However, most of the writings of the founding prophet Mani have been lost. Some scholars and anti-Catholic polemicists argue that its influence subtly continues in Western Christian thought via Saint Augustine of Hippo, who converted to Christianity from Manichaeism and whose writing continues to be enormously influential among Catholic and Protestant theologians.
Marxism
A set of philosophical, political and economic positions and movements based on the work of Karl Marx and Friedrich Engels. Marx's philosophy of history included the notion of class struggle within dialectical materialism. Marxism was the intellectual foundation for the 20th-century political movement known as communism, and was developed into various factions such as Leninism, Stalinism, Maoism, and Trotskyism, each hewing to the ideas of a particular political leader.
materialism
The philosophical view that the only thing that can truly be said to 'exist' is matter; that fundamentally, all things are composed of "material" and all phenomena are the result of material interactions.
Mazdaism
The religion that acknowledges the divine authority of Ahura Mazda, proclaimed by Zoroaster (see Zoroastrianism) to be the one uncreated creator of all (god).
mechanism
The theory that all natural phenomena can be explained by physical causes. It can be contrasted with vitalism, the philosophical theory that vital forces are active in living organisms, so that life cannot be explained solely by mechanism.
meliorism
The idea in metaphysics that humans can, through their interference with natural processes, produce an improvement over the natural outcome. It is at the foundation of contemporary liberal democracy and human rights, and is contrasted by the concept of apologism.
mentalism
The view, in philosophy of mind, that the mind and mental states exist as causally efficacious inner states of persons. The view should be distinguished from substance dualism, which is the view that the mind and the body (or brain) are two distinct kinds of things, which nevertheless interact (somehow) with one another. Although this dualistic view of the mind-body connection entails mentalism, mentalism does not entail dualism. Jerry Fodor and Noam Chomsky have been two of mentalism's most ardent recent defenders.
metaphysical naturalism
The belief that nature is in fact all that exists. The term applies to any worldview in which nature is all there is and all things supernatural do not exist (including spirits and souls, non-natural values, and universals as they are commonly conceived).
metaphysics
A traditional branch of philosophy concerned with explaining the fundamental nature of being and the world that encompasses it, although the term is not easily defined. Traditionally, metaphysics attempts to answer two basic questions in the broadest possible terms: Ultimately, what is there? and what is it like? A person who studies metaphysics is called a metaphysician. The metaphysician attempts to clarify the fundamental notions by which people understand the world, e.g., existence, objects and their properties, space and time, cause and effect, and possibility. A central branch of metaphysics is ontology, the investigation into the basic categories of being and how they relate to each other. Another central branch of metaphysics is cosmology, the study of the origin, fundamental structure, nature, and dynamics of the universe. Some include epistemology as another central focus of metaphysics, but other philosophers question this.
methodological behaviorism
The objective study of third-person behavior; the data of psychology must be inter-subjectively verifiable; no theoretical prescriptions. It has been absorbed into general experimental and cognitive psychology.
methodological naturalism
The view that philosophy does not precede or provide the foundations for science but that science and philosophy are continuous with one another, employing roughly the same methodological principles at different levels of generality. Generally, methodological naturalists have a high level of respect for the scientific method, thinking that it is the best method for uncovering the truth.
methodological reductionism
The idea that explanations of things, such as scientific explanations, ought to be continually reduced to the very simplest entities possible (but no simpler). Occam's Razor forms the basis of this type of reductionism.
methodological relativism
The idea that a researcher must suspend his or her own cultural biases while attempting to understand beliefs and behaviors within their local contexts. See also ethnocentrism.
modal realism
The view most notably put forth by David Lewis that possible worlds are as concretely real as the actual world.
modernism
The series of reforming cultural movements in art and architecture, music, literature, and the applied arts which emerged roughly in the period between 1884 and 1914. Modernism affirms the power of human beings to create, improve, and reshape their environments, with the aid of scientific knowledge, technology, and practical experimentation. The term covers many political, cultural, and artistic movements rooted in the changes in Western society at the end of the 19th and the beginning of the 20th century.
Mohism
The philosophy of Chinese philosopher Mozi, distinguished for its principles of universal love and mutual (utilitarian) benefit.
Molinism
A religious doctrine that attempts to reconcile the omniscience of the supreme deity with human free will. Named after the 16th-century Jesuit theologian Luis de Molina.
monism
The metaphysical and theological view that there is only one principle, essence, substance, or energy. Monism is distinguished from dualism, which holds that ultimately there are exactly two such principles, and from pluralism, which holds that there are many such principles.
monistic theism
The type of monotheism found in Hinduism. This type of theism is different from the Semitic religions as it encompasses panentheism, monism, and at the same time includes the concept of a personal God as a universal, omnipotent supreme being. The other types of monotheism are qualified monism, the school of Ramanuja or Vishishtadvaita, which admits that the universe is part of God, or Narayana, a type of panentheism, but there is a plurality of souls within this supreme Being and Dvaita, which differs in that it is dualistic, as God is separate and not panentheistic.
monolatrism
The philosophy that holds that there are many gods, with a worshiper of any god receiving his or her blessing.
monotheism
The belief in a single, universal, all-encompassing deity. Zoroastrianism and the Abrahamic religions are considered monotheist.
moral absolutism
The position that there are absolute standards against which moral questions can be judged, and that certain actions are right or wrong, regardless of the context of the action; the belief in a single set of "rights" and "wrongs", with no variation. These are known by all people and to not respect them is a choice.
moral realism
The conjunction of the following three claims: moral judgments express beliefs, these beliefs are either true or false, and therefore objective moral values exist. It contrasts with expressivist or non-cognitivist theories of moral judgment, error theories of moral judgments, fictionalist theories of moral judgment, and constructivist or relativist theories of the nature of moral facts.
moral relativism
The belief that there are no moral facts independent of an individual's or culture's beliefs or desires. Depending on the version of relativism, a given moral statement is true only if an individual (in the case of ethical subjectivism) believes it to be, or if a culture (in the case of cultural relativism) believes it to be true.
moral universalism
The view that there are moral propositions that apply universally.
mysticism
The pursuit of achieving communion, identity with, or conscious awareness of ultimate reality, the divinity, or spiritual truth through direct experience, intuition, or insight. Traditions may include a belief in the literal existence of dimensional realities beyond empirical perception, or a belief that a true human perception of the world goes beyond current logical reasoning or intellectual comprehension.

== N ==
naïve realism

The common view of the world including the claims that it is as it is perceived, that objects have the properties attributed to them, and that they maintain these properties when not being perceived.
nativism
An opposition to immigration that originated in United States politics, that distinguishes between Americans who were born in the United States, and "first-generation" immigrants. It is based on fears the immigrants do not share supposedly American values.
naturalism
Any of several philosophical stances, typically those descended from materialism and pragmatism, that do not distinguish the supernatural (including strange entities like non-natural values, and universals as they are commonly conceived) from nature. Naturalism does not necessarily claim that phenomena or hypotheses commonly labeled as supernatural do not exist or are wrong, but insists that all phenomena and hypotheses can be studied by the same methods and therefore anything considered supernatural is either nonexistent, unknowable, or not inherently different from natural phenomena or hypotheses.
necessitarianism
A metaphysical principle that denies that any facts or events are contingent or indeterminate, from human actions to the laws of physics themselves.
neo-Confucianism
A form of Confucianism primarily developed during the Song dynasty, as a response to the dominance of Taoism and Buddhism at the time. Neo-Confucians such as Zhu Xi recognized that the Confucianism lacked a thorough metaphysical system, and so synthesized one based on previous Confucian concepts. There were many competing views within the Neo-Confucian community, but overall, a system emerged that resembled both the Buddhist and Taoist thought of the time.
neo-Marxism
A loose term for various 20th-century approaches that amend or extend Marxism and Marxist theory, usually by incorporating elements from other intellectual traditions (such as critical theory).
neo-Platonism
A school of philosophy that took shape in the 3rd century A.D. The school was characterized by a systematization of Platonic metaphysics along with a pursuit of mystical union with the divine, had an enormous influence to centuries of Christian, Jewish, and Islamic philosophy and religion.
New Confucianism
A new movement of Confucianism since the 20th century applying Confucianism to modern times. Not to be confused with neo-Confucianism.
nihilism
The philosophical view that the world, and especially human existence, is without meaning, purpose, comprehensible truth, or essential value. It is more often a charge leveled against a particular idea than a position to which someone is overtly subscribed. Movements such as Dada, Deconstructionism, and punk have been described by various observers as "nihilist".
nominalism
The belief that universals or mental concepts have no objective reality but exist only as words or "names" (Latin nomina).
non-cognitivism
The meta-ethical view that moral statements do not assert propositions i.e. they do not express factual claims or beliefs and therefore lack truth-value. This view should be distinguished from moral realism, skepticism, subjectivism, relativism, and nihilism; proponents of these views avow that moral statements are either true or false.
nontheism
The absence of belief in both the existence and non-existence of a deity (or deities, or other numinous phenomena). The word is often employed as a blanket term for all belief systems that are not essentially theistic, including atheism (both strong and weak) and agnosticism, as well as certain Eastern religions like Confucianism, Taoism, and Zen Buddhism.

== O ==
objective idealism
An idealistic metaphysics that postulates that there is in an important sense only one perceiver, and that this perceiver is one with that which is perceived.
objectivism
In ethics, the belief that certain acts are objectively right or wrong.
occasionalism
The philosophical theory about causation stating that created substances cannot be efficient causes of events. Instead, all events are taken to be caused directly by the supreme deity itself. (A related theory, which has been called 'occasional causation', also denies a link of efficient causation between mundane events, but may differ as to the identity of the true cause that replaces them).
Old Earth creationism
A variant of the creationist view of the origin of the universe and life on Earth. As a theory of origins it is typically more compatible with mainstream scientific thought on the issues of geology, cosmology and the age of the Earth, in comparison to Young Earth creationism.
Omphalos creationism
Named after the title of an 1857 book, Omphalos by Philip Henry Gosse, in which Gosse argued that in order for the world to be "functional", God must have created the Earth with mountains and canyons, trees with growth rings, Adam and Eve with hair, fingernails, and navels (omphalos is Greek for "navel"), and that therefore no evidence that people can see of the presumed age of the Earth and Universe can be taken as reliable. The idea has seen some revival in the 20th century by some modern creationists, who have extended the argument to light that appears to originate in far-off stars and galaxies, although many other creationists reject this explanation (and also believe that Adam and Eve had no navels).
ontological reductionism
The idea that everything that exists is made from a small number of basic substances that behave in regular ways. Compare monism.
ontologism
The ideological system that maintains that God and divine ideas are the first object of humans' intelligence and that the intuition of God is the first act of their intellectual knowledge. Note that Martin Heidegger used the term Onto-theology to refer to answering questions of being with direct reference to belief in God.
open theism
A religious approach combining classical theism as well as Ancient Greek beliefs that question the ideas of free will and the timeless nature of the supreme deity.
operationalism
The philosophy of defining a concept as the operations that will measure the concept (variables) through specific observations.
optimism
Historically, the philosophical position that this is the best of all possible worlds, usually associated with Gottfried Leibniz. Colloquially, the term is often used to refer to a cheerful or positive worldview.
organicism
A philosophical orientation that asserts that reality is best understood as an organic whole. By definition it is close to holism. Benedict Spinoza and Constantin Brunner are two philosophers whose thought is best understood as organicist.
orthocracy
A philosophical logical scheme that asserts minimal deviation of practice from theory during management of material and immaterial wealth under strict adherence to ethical principles of human communities. By definition it is close to orthodoxy. Aristoteles and Socrates are two philosophers whose thoughts could point to orthocracy.

== P ==
pacifism
In ethics or politics, an opposition to war or violence. Can range from advocacy of peaceful solutions to problems, to a stance where all violence or force is considered morally wrong.
pancritical rationalism
A sub-concept of critical rationalism, it argues that every tenet of science or commonly held truth should be questioned regardless of an authority figure's justification or assurance that it is true.
pandeism
A type of deism that combines the deistic belief in a rationally determined, non-intervening God with the idea of pantheism of God being identical to the Universe with the idea from deism that God is revealed by rational examination and does not intervene in the Universe. Combines deism with pantheism to propose a deistic God that becomes a pantheistic Universe.
panentheism
The theological position that the supreme deity is immanent within the Universe, but also transcends it. It is distinguished from pantheism, which holds that God is synonymous with the material universe. In panentheism, God is viewed as creator and/or animating force behind the universe, and the source of universal morality. The term is closely associated with the Logos of Greek philosophy in the works of Herakleitos, which pervades the cosmos and whereby all things were made.
panpsychism
Either the view that all parts of matter involve mind, or the more holistic view that the whole universe is an organism that possesses a mind. It is thus a stronger and more ambitious view than hylozoism, which holds only that all things are alive. This is not to say that panpsychism believes that all matter is alive or even conscious but rather that the constituent parts of matter are composed of some form of mind and are sentient.
pantheism
The view that everything is of an all-encompassing immanent God; or that the universe, or nature, and God are equivalent. More detailed definitions tend to emphasize the idea that natural law, existence and/or the universe (the sum total of all that was, is, or shall be) is represented or personified in the theological principle of 'God'. The existence of a transcendent supreme extraneous to nature is denied. Depending on how this is understood, such a view may be presented as tantamount to atheism, deism or theism.
particularism
In epistemology, the approach wherein one asks the question "What do we know?" before asking "How do we know?" The term appears in Roderick Chisholm's "The Problem of the Criterion" and in the work of his student, Ernest Sosa ("The Raft and the Pyramid: Coherence versus Foundations in the Theory of Knowledge"). Particularism is contrasted with methodism, which answers the latter question before the former. Since the question "What do we know?" implies that humans retain knowledge, particularism is fundamentally anti-skeptical.
Pelagianism
The belief that original sin did not taint human nature (which, being created from the supreme deity, was divine), and that mortal will is still capable of choosing good or evil without divine aid.
perfectionism
An ethical view that maintains an individual lives the Good life to the extent she successfully exercises character traits that are a part of her nature.
personalism
A school of thought that consists of three main principles: only people are real (in the ontological sense), only people have value, and only people have free will. Personalism flourished in the early 20th century at Boston University in a movement known as Boston Personalism and led by theologian Borden Parker Bowne.
perspectivism
A philosophical view developed by the German philosopher Friedrich Nietzsche that all perception and ideation takes place from a particular perspective in terms of inner drives as elucidated by the "will to power".
phenomenal conservatism
The philosophy that holds that it is reasonable to assume that things are as they appear, unless there are positive grounds for doubting this.
phenomenalism
In epistemology and the philosophy of perception, the view that physical objects do not exist as things in themselves but only as perceptual phenomena or sensory stimuli (e.g. redness, hardness, softness, sweetness, etc.) situated in time and in space. In particular, phenomenalism reduces discussion about physical objects in the external world to discussion about "bundles of sense-data".
philanthropy
a form of altruism that consists of "private initiatives for the public good, focusing on quality of life". Philanthropy contrasts with business initiatives, which are private initiatives for private good, focusing on material gain; and with government endeavors that are public initiatives for public good, such as those that focus on the provision of public services.
philosophical pessimism
A family of philosophical views that assign a negative value to life or existence. Philosophical pessimists commonly argue that the world contains an empirical prevalence of pains over pleasures, that existence is ontologically or metaphysically adverse to living beings, and that life is fundamentally meaningless or without purpose.
philosophical theism
The belief that a supreme deity exists (or must exist), independent of the teaching or revelation of any particular religion. Some philosophical theists are persuaded of god's existence by philosophical arguments, while others consider themselves to have a religious faith that need not be, or could not be, supported by rational argument.
philosophy
A broad field of inquiry concerning knowledge, in which the definition of knowledge itself is one of the subjects investigated. Philosophy is the pursuit of wisdom, spanning the nature of the Universe and human nature (of the mind and the body) as well as the relationships between these and between people. It explores what and how people come to know, including existence itself, and how that knowledge is reliably and usefully represented and communicated between and among humans, whether in thought, by language, or with mathematics. Philosophy is the predecessor and complement of science. It develops notions about the issues that underlie science and ponders the nature of thought itself. The scientific method, which involves repeated observations of the results of controlled experiments, is an available and highly successful philosophical methodology. Within fields of study that are concerned directly with humans (economics, psychology, sociology, and so forth), in which experimental methodologies are generally not available, sub-disciplines of philosophy have been developed to provide a rational basis for study in the respective fields.
physicalism
The metaphysical position asserting that everything that exists has one or more physical properties; that is, that there are no kinds of things other than physical things. In contemporary philosophy, physicalism is most frequently associated with the philosophy of mind, in particular the mind-body problem, in which it holds that the mind is a physical thing in some sense. Physicalism is also called "materialism", but the term "physicalism" is preferable because it has evolved with the physical sciences to incorporate far more sophisticated notions of physicality than matter; for example, wave/particle relationships and unseen, non-material forces.
Platonic realism
A belief in the existence of universals as articulated by Plato. Platonic realism is often called Plato's theory of forms.
Platonism
The school of philosophy founded by Plato. Often used to refer to Platonic idealism, the belief that the entities of the phenomenal world are imperfect reflections of an ideal truth. In metaphysics sometimes used to mean the claim that universals exist independent of particulars. Predecessor and precursor of Aristotelianism.
pluralism
In the area of philosophy of the mind, distinguishes a position where one believes there to be ultimately many kinds of substances in the world, as opposed to monism and dualism. (See also cosmotheism).
political absolutism

A political theory that argues that one person should hold all power.
polylogism
The belief that people who associate with one group or another think differently.
polytheism
The belief in or worship of multiple gods or divinities. Most ancient religions were polytheistic, holding to pantheons of traditional deities, often accumulated over centuries of cultural interchange and experience. The belief in many gods does not contradict or preclude also believing in an all-powerful all-knowing supreme being.
positivism
The philosophical position that the only authentic knowledge is scientific knowledge. It is an approach to the philosophy of science, deriving from Enlightenment thinkers like Pierre-Simon Laplace. See also logical positivism.
post-structuralism
A varied reaction to structuralism that views the signifier and signified as inseparable, but not united.
posthumanism
A development of humanism that rejects a special position in nature for humanity.
postmodernism
A philosophical movement characterized by the postmodern criticism and analysis of Western philosophy. Beginning as a critique of Continental philosophy, it was heavily influenced by phenomenology, structuralism, and existentialism, and by the philosophers Friedrich Nietzsche and Martin Heidegger. It was also influenced to some degree by Ludwig Wittgenstein's later criticisms of analytic philosophy. Within postmodern philosophy, there are numerous interrelated fields, including deconstruction and several fields beginning with the prefix "post-", such as post-structuralism, post-Marxism, and post-feminism. In particular postmodern philosophy has spawned a huge literature of critical theory.
pragmatism
A philosophy that originated in the United States in the late 19th century. Pragmatism is characterized by the insistence on consequences, utility and practicality as vital components of meaning and truth. Pragmatism objects to the view that human concepts and intellect represent reality, and therefore stands in opposition to both formalist and rationalist schools of philosophy. Rather, pragmatism holds that it is only in the struggle of intelligent organisms with the surrounding environment that theories acquire significance, and only with a theory's success in this struggle that it becomes true.
prescriptivism
A meta-ethical theory about the semantical content of moral statements, introduced by the philosopher R. M. Hare in his book The Language of Morals. It holds that moral statements functions similarly to imperatives. For example, according to prescriptivism, the statement "Killing is wrong" means something like "You should not kill". What it expresses is an imperative.
probabilism
A practical doctrine that gives assistance in ordinary matters to one who is skeptical in respect of the possibility of real knowledge: it supposes that though knowledge is impossible, a man may rely on strong beliefs in practical affairs. This view was held by the skeptics of the New Academy (see skepticism and Carneades.). Opposed to "probabilism" is "probabiliorism" (Latin probabilior, "more likely"), which holds that when there is a preponderance of evidence on one side of a controversy that side is presumably right. Academic skeptics accept probabilism, while Pyrrhonian skeptics do not.
psychological behaviorism
A variety of behaviorism based upon a program of human research involving various types of human behavior, as proposed by Arthur W. Staats.
psychological egoism
The descriptive view that humans are always motivated by self-interest.
psychologism
The philosophy that holds that human knowledge can be expanded solely through philosophical study.
Pyrrhonian skepticism
A Hellenistic school of skepticism that inquired about, but did not reject, dogmatic beliefs because the lack of belief is not the same as disbelief.
Pyrrhonism
A Hellenistic philosophy that was the earliest Western school of philosophical skepticism. Like the other Hellenistic philosophies, its objective was eudaimonia, which in Pyrrhonism is achieved by attaining ataraxia (i.e., a state of being unperturbed). Ataraxia is achieved through coming to see that all assertions with regard to non-evident propositions (i.e., dogmas) are ultimately unprovable, thus the attitude one should have of them is to suspend judgment (i.e., epoche).
Pythagoreanism
The set of esoteric and metaphysical beliefs held by the Ancient Greek philosopher Pythagoras and his followers (known as the Pythagoreans), who were considerably influenced by mathematics. Pythagoreanism greatly influenced Platonism. Later revivals of Pythagorean doctrines led to what is now called Neopythagoreanism.

Philanthropy Philanthropy is a form of altruism that consists of "private initiatives for the public good, focusing on quality of life". Philanthropy contrasts with business initiatives, which are private initiatives for private good, focusing on material gain; and with government endeavors that are public initiatives for public good, such as those that focus on the provision of public services. A person who practices philanthropy is a philanthropist.

== Q ==
quasi-realism
A non-cognitivist, expressivist meta-ethical and epistemological theory developed by professor Simon Blackburn. It holds that although propositions supervene on states of mind, they have many realist characteristics, such as only being able to change slowly or in response to changes in natural properties.
Qualia
Qualia is defined as individual instances of subjective, conscious experience. Examples of qualia include the perceived sensation of pain of a headache, the taste of wine, as well as the redness of an evening sky. As qualitative characters of sensation, qualia stand in contrast to propositional attitudes, where the focus is on beliefs about experience rather than what it is directly like to be experiencing.

== R ==
radical behaviorism
Skinner's behaviorism is considered radical since it expands behavioral principles to processes within the organism; in contrast to methodological behaviorism; not mechanistic or reductionist; hypothetical (mentalistic) internal states are not considered causes of behavior, phenomena must be observable at least to the individual experiencing them. Willard Van Orman Quine made use of many of radical behaviorism ideas in his study of knowing and language.
Randianism
The individualist movement founded by Ayn Rand, known by its adherents as objectivism.
rationalism
A theory or method based on the thesis that human reason can in principle be the source of all knowledge. In the modern period, rationalism was initially championed by René Descartes and spread during the 17th and 18th centuries, primarily in continental Europe. It is opposed with empiricism.
realism
A view of a reality ontologically independent of conception, perception, etc. Objects have certain properties regardless of any thought to the contrary.
reconstructivism
A philosophy that holds that societies should continually reform in order to establish a more perfect government or social network.
reductionism
A number of related, contentious theories that hold, very roughly, that the nature of complex things can always be reduced to (be explained by) simpler or more fundamental things. This is said of objects, phenomena, explanations, theories, and meanings. In short, it is philosophical materialism taken to its logical consequences.
reductive materialism
See reductionism.
relationalism
In the philosophy of physics, relationalism holds that space and time only exist as relations between objects such as matter and radiation, rather than being ontologically basic entities in their own right.
relativism
The view that the meaning and value of human beliefs and behaviors have no absolute reference. Relativists claim that humans understand and evaluate beliefs and behaviors only in terms of, for example, their historical and cultural context. Philosophers identify many different kinds of relativism depending upon what allegedly depends on something and what something depends on.
reliabilism
In epistemology, the claim that the status of a belief as knowledge should be judged by whether it was arrived upon through a reliable method. For instance, scientific experiment may be considered a more reliable method than intuition or guesswork.
religious humanism
A philosophy based on the integration of religious rituals and/or beliefs with humanistic philosophy that centers on human needs, interests, and abilities (such as art).
representationalism
A philosophical concept that states that humans do not (and can not) perceive the external world directly; instead they know only their ideas or interpretations of objects in the world. Thus, a barrier or a veil of perception prevents first-hand knowledge of anything beyond it. The "veil" exists between the mind and the existing world.
Romanticism
A philosophy that expresses art as an emotional experience based on the appreciation of the aesthetic. Romanticism is a philosophy where art is celebrated due to the emotional reaction on the part of the receiver.

== S ==
scholasticism
A school of philosophy taught by the academics (or schoolmen) of medieval universities circa 1100–1500. Scholasticism attempted to reconcile the philosophy of the ancient classical philosophers with medieval Christian theology. The primary purpose of scholasticism was to find the answer to a question or resolve a contradiction. It is most well known in its application in medieval theology but was applied to classical philosophy and other fields of study. It is not a philosophy or theology on its own, but a tool and method for learning that emphasizes dialectical reasoning.
scientific reductionism
Any of the above ideas as they relate to science or the idea that all phenomena can be reduced to scientific explanations.
scientism
The belief that science has primacy over other ways of obtaining knowledge. This term is often used in a derogatory manner, to refer to a level of trust or reliance upon scientific progress that the speaker deems excessive.
Scotism
The philosophical school and theological system named after John Duns Scotus. It heavily criticized the Old Franciscan School and thomism.
secular humanism

A system of belief that upholds ethics and reason as the sole means of gaining knowledge. Secular humanists reject blind faith and dogma in favor of scientific inquiry, and most agree that science and rationality can be supplemented with help from the arts.
secularism
In politics, the notion of the independence of the state from religion; the advocacy of a state that is neutral on matters of religious belief. Secularism, or religious freedom, is usually considered to go both ways: the state should not compel the people to follow (or not follow) a religion, and likewise religious doctrines should not influence the actions of the state.
Sikhism
A monotheistic dharmic religion based on the teachings of Guru Nanak Dev.
semipelagianism
A Christian theological understanding about salvation, derived from the earlier Pelagian teachings about salvation. It teaches that it is necessary for humans to make the first step toward God and then God will complete salvation.
sensualism
A philosophical theory in which sensations and perception are the basic and most important form of true cognition. This opposes realism. The base principle of sensualism is "there is not anything in mind, which hasn't been in feelings". Philosophers of sensualism include John Locke and Étienne Bonnot de Condillac.
singularitarianism
A moral philosophy based upon the belief that a technological singularity - the technological creation of smarter-than-human intelligence - is possible, advocating deliberate action to effect and ensure its safety. While some futurologists and transhumanists speculate on the possibility and nature of this supposed singularity (often referred to as the Singularity, a term coined by Vernor Vinge), a Singularitarian believes it is not only possible, but that it can also be guided, and acts in ways that he/she believes will contribute to its safety and early arrival.
situationalism
Another name for situation ethics, which is a Christian ethical theory that was principally developed in the 1960s by the Episcopal priest Joseph Fletcher. It basically states that sometimes other moral principles can be cast aside in certain situations if love is best served; as Paul Tillich once put it: 'Love is the ultimate law'. The moral principles Fletcher is specifically referring to are the moral codes of Christianity and the type of love he is specifically referring to is 'Agape' love.
skepticism
A school or method of doubt regarding what is held as knowledge.
social atomism
The point-of-view that individuals rather than social institutions and values are the proper subject of analysis since all properties of institutions and values merely accumulate from the strivings of individuals.
social Darwinism
A 19th-century political philosophy that attempted to explain differences in social status (particularly class and racial differences) on the basis of evolutionary fitness. Social Darwinism is generally considered unscientific by modern philosophers of science.
socialism
An ideology with the core belief that a society should exist in which popular collectives control the means of power, and therefore the means of production. Though the de facto meaning of socialism has changed over time, it remains strongly related to the establishment of an organized working class, created either through revolution or by social evolution, with the purpose of building a classless society. Socialism had its origins in the ideals of the Enlightenment, during the Industrial Age, amid yearnings for a more egalitarian society. Socialist ideologies have since become increasingly concentrated on social reforms within modern democracies.
solipsism
The view that only direct mental experience is certain, as things external to one's mind cannot be known.
sophism
In Ancient Greece, the teaching of rhetoric and persuasion; in modern times, a deceptive argument not based on logic.
speciesism
The belief that rights and moral standing and/or moral personhood ought to be assigned on the basis of membership within a biological species. Usually involves the belief that humans have greater value or worth than non-human animal species.
spiritualism
A religious movement, prominent from the 1840s to the 1920s, found primarily in English-speaking countries. The movement's distinguishing feature is the belief that the spirits of the dead can be contacted by adepts. These spirits are believed to lie on a higher spiritual plane than humans, and are therefore capable of providing guidance in both worldly and spiritual matters.
statism
The doctrine that the political authority of the state is to some degree legitimate, especially as it is used to enforce economic and social policy. Opposing views include antistatism and anarchism.
Stoicism
A Hellenistic school with the principle that self-control, both emotional and physical, leads to an inner strength and character that enables one to harmoniously interact with the natural world. It is often contrasted with Epicureanism.
strong agnosticism

The view that the evidence in the universe is such that it is impossible for humans to know whether or not any deities exist.
strong atheism
The philosophical position that deities do not exist. It is a form of explicit atheism, meaning that it consciously rejects theism. Some strong atheists also claim that the existence of any and all gods is logically impossible. Also called positive atheism, hard atheism and gnostic atheism. A strong atheist also fits the definition of a weak atheist, but that the reverse is not necessarily true: a strong atheist believes there is a lack or absence of evidence for justifying a belief in God or gods, but a weak atheist does not necessarily deny the possibility of God or god(s) existence.
structuralism
Any approach or theory that studies underlying structural relationships between concepts.
subjective idealism
A philosophy in which human experiences are based on perceptions.
subjectivism
A doctrine that associates objects with subjective experience rather than independent existence.
substance dualism
A type of ontological dualism defended by Descartes in which it is claimed that there are two fundamental kinds of substance: mental and material. The mental does not extend in space, and the material cannot think. Substance dualism holds that immortal souls occupy an independent realm of existence, while apparently bodies die; this view contradicts physicalism.
substance monotheism
Found e.g. in some indigenous African religions, holds that the many gods are different forms of a single underlying substance, and that this underlying substance is God. This view has some similarities to the Christian trinitarian view of three persons sharing one nature.
substantialism
The philosophy that there are sentient entities behind phenomena.
surrealism
A cultural movement that began in the early-1920s, best known for the visual artworks and writings of the group members. The works feature the element of surprise, unexpected juxtapositions and non sequitur, however many Surrealist artists and writers regard their work as an expression of the philosophical movement first and foremost with the works being an artifact, and leader André Breton was explicit in his assertion that Surrealism was above all a revolutionary movement.
symbolism
The applied use of any iconic representations that carry particular conventional meanings. "Symbolism" may refer to a way of choosing representative symbols abstractly rather than literally, allowing broader interpretation of their meaning than more literal concept-representations allow.
syncretism
The attempt to reconcile disparate, even opposing, beliefs and to meld practices of various schools of thought. It is especially associated with the attempt to merge or analogize several originally discrete traditions, especially in the theology and mythology of religion, and thus to assert an underlying unity.

== T ==
Taoism
A group of Chinese religious and philosophical traditions. Philosophical Taoism emphasizes various themes found in the Daodejing and Zhuangzi such as "nonaction" (wu wei), emptiness, detachment, receptiveness, spontaneity, the strength of softness, the relativism of human values, and the search for a long life. Religious Taoism is not clearly separated from philosophy, but incorporates a number of supernatural beliefs in gods, ghosts, ancestral spirits, and practices such as Taoist alchemy and qigong.
teleological behaviorism
Post-Skinnerian, purposive, close to microeconomics.
teleologism
The supposition that there is design, purpose, directive principle, or finality in the works and processes of nature, and the philosophical study of that purpose. Teleology stands in contrast to philosophical naturalism, and both ask questions separate from the questions of science. While science investigates natural laws and phenomena, philosophical naturalism and teleology investigate the existence or non-existence of an organizing principle behind those natural laws and phenomena. Philosophical naturalism asserts that there are no such principles, while teleology asserts that there are.
theism
The view that there is one or more deities. More specifically, it may also mean the belief in God, a god, or gods, who is/are actively involved in maintaining the Universe. A theist can also take the position that he does not have sufficient evidence to "know" whether God or gods exist, although he believes it through faith.
theological noncognitivism
The argument that religious language, and specifically words like "God" (capitalized), are not cognitively meaningful. It is cited as proof of the nonexistence of anything named "God", and therefore is a basis for atheism. There are two main arguments: Kai Nielsen used verifiability theory of meaning to conclude that religious language is meaningless because it is not verifiable, proving weak atheism. George H. Smith used an attribute-based approach to argue that the concept of "god" has no meaningful attributes, only negatively defined or relational attributes, making it meaningless — leading to the conclusion that "god does not exist", thus proving strong atheism.
Thomism
The philosophical school that followed in the legacy of Thomas Aquinas. The word comes from the name of its originator, whose summary work Summa Theologiae has arguably been second to only the Bible in importance to the Catholic Church.
totalitarianism
A typology employed by political scientists to denote modern regimes in which the state regulates nearly every aspect of public and private behavior. Totalitarian regimes mobilize entire populations in support of the state and a political ideology, and do not tolerate activities by individuals or groups such as labor unions, churches and political parties that are not directed toward the state's goals. They maintain themselves in power by means of secret police, propaganda disseminated through the state-controlled mass media, regulation and restriction of free discussion and criticism, and widespread use of terror tactics.
transcendental idealism
The philosophy of Immanuel Kant and later Kantian and German idealist philosophers, according to which human experience is not of things as they are in themselves, but of those things as they appear to human beings. It differs from standard (empirical) idealism in that it does not claim that the objects of human experience would be in any sense within the mind. The idea is that whenever humans experience something, they experience it as it is for themselves: the object is real as well as mind-independent, but is, in a sense, altered by people's cognition (by the categories and the forms of sensibility, space and time). Transcendental idealism denies that people could have knowledge of the thing in itself; the opposite view is sometimes called transcendental realism.
transcendentalism
A group of new ideas in literature, religion, culture, and philosophy that advocates that there is an ideal spiritual state that 'transcends' the physical and empirical and is only realized through a knowledgeable intuitive awareness that is conditional upon the individual. The concept emerged in New England in the early-to mid-19th century. It is sometimes called "American Transcendentalism" to distinguish it from other uses of the word transcendental. It began as a protest against the general state of culture and society at the time, and in particular, the state of intellectualism at Harvard and the doctrine of the Unitarian church that was taught at Harvard Divinity School. The term transcendentalism sometimes serves as shorthand for "transcendental idealism". Another alternative meaning for transcendentalism is the classical philosophy that God transcends the manifest world. As John Scotus Erigena put it to Frankish king Charles the Bald in the year 840 A.D., "We do not know what God is. God himself doesn't know what He is because He is not anything. Literally God is not, because He transcends being."
transhumanism
The international, intellectual, and cultural movement supporting the use of new sciences and technologies to enhance human mental and physical abilities and aptitudes, and to ameliorate what it regards as undesirable and unnecessary aspects of the human condition, such as suffering, disease, aging, and involuntary death. The term is often used as a synonym for human enhancement.
transtheism
Assumes the existence of the supreme deity as an absent deity and the ultimate concept of God's existence is transcendent and external to all other forms of existence, which implies an impersonal, non-anthropomorphic, non-universemorphic or even non-cosmosmorphic being and view of God. In transtheism, God has one primary attribute, transcendence.
truth
truth claim
A statement that is either true or false, and claimed to be true.

== U ==
universalism
Another name for moral universalism, as a compromise between moral relativism and moral absolutism.
utilitarianism
A theory of ethics that maintains that an act is moral if and only if it maximizes welfare. It is a form of consequentialism and welfarism.
utopianism
The many various social and political movements, and a significant body of religious and secular literature, based upon the idea that paradise is achievable on Earth.

== V ==
value pluralism
The idea that two or more moral values may be equally ultimate (true), yet in conflict. In addition, it postulates that in many cases, such incompatible values may be rationally incommensurable. As such, value pluralism is a theory in metaethics, rather than an ethical theory or a set of values in itself. Isaiah Berlin is accredited with having done the first substantial work on value pluralism, bringing it to the attention of general academia.
verificationism
An epistemic theory of truth based on the idea that the mind engages in a certain kind of activity: "verifying" a proposition. The distinctive claim of verificationism is that the result of such verifications is, by definition, truth. That is, truth is reducible to this process of verification.
vitalism
The doctrine that so-called "vital forces" are active in living organisms, so that life cannot be explained solely by mechanism. That element is often referred to as the vital spark or energy, which some equate with the soul.
voluntarism
A school of thought that regards the will as superior to the intellect and to emotion. Voluntarism was introduced into philosophical literature by Ferdinand Tönnies and developed further in the writings of Wilhelm Wundt and Friedrich Paulsen.
voluntaryism
A theory advocated by Auberon Herbert, stressing "voluntary taxation" and the boycott of electoral politics. The original sources for voluntaryism can be found in Herbert's book The Right and Wrong of Compulsion by the State. Some, such as Benjamin Tucker, view Herbert's philosophy as anarchism, however he never called himself an anarchist as he considered anarchism to be a philosophy that does not provide for defense of person and property.

== W ==
weak agnosticism
The position that the evidence is such that the existence or nonexistence of deities is currently unknown, but is not necessarily unknowable. Also called implicit agnosticism, empirical agnosticism, and negative agnosticism.
weak atheism
Disbelief in the existence of any deity, without a commitment to the necessary non-existence of God or gods. Also referred to as negative atheism or implicit atheism. The weak atheist generally gives a broad definition of atheism as a lack or absence of evidence justifying a belief in God or gods, which defines atheism as a range of positions that entail non-belief, unjustified belief, doubt, or denial of theism.

== Y ==
Young Earth creationism
The religious belief that Heaven, Earth, and life on Earth were created by a direct act of the supreme deity dating between 6,000 and 10,000 years ago. Its adherents are those Christians, Jews and Muslims who believe that God created the Earth in six 24-hour days, taking the Hebrew text of Genesis as a literal account.
youthism
The view that youths possess the same rights as adults.

== Z ==
Zen Buddhism
A fusion of Mahayana Buddhism and Taoism, practiced chiefly in China and Japan. It places great importance on moment-by-moment awareness and 'seeing deeply into the nature of things' by direct experience. The name derives from the Sanskrit word dhyana referring to a particular meditative state.
Zoroastrianism
The religion and philosophy based on the teachings ascribed to the prophet Zoroaster (Zarathustra, Zartosht).

== See also ==
- Outline of philosophy
- List of philosophies
- Index of philosophy
- List of thought processes
- Glossary of logic
