= -ism =

English-language suffix

Cover of The Isms of Art (1925) by Jean Arp and El Lissitzky, listing many art movements such as constructivism, Dadaism, expressionism, among others.

Ism / -ism (/-ˌɪzəm/) is a suffix in many English words, originally derived from the Ancient Greek suffix -ισμός (-ismós), and reached English through the Latin -ismus, and the French -isme. It is used to create abstract nouns of action, state, condition, or doctrine, and is often used to describe philosophies, theories, religions, social movements, artistic movements, lifestyles, behaviors, scientific phenomena, or medical conditions. The suffix has also been used as an independent noun since the 17th century. The concept of an 'ism' can, and often does, resemble that of a grand narrative.

== History ==
=== British origins and development, 17th to 19th century ===
The first recorded usage of the suffix ism as a separate word in its own right was in 1680. By the nineteenth century it was being used by Thomas Carlyle to signify a pre-packaged ideology. It was later used in this sense by such writers as Julian Huxley and George Bernard Shaw. This is the state of affairs characterized by Andreas Dorschel: "An 'ism', the modern political manifestation of living in terms of options, only ever makes sense within a field of possibilities between which one can, and indeed must, choose. In 19th century politics, they ranged from socialism to liberalism to conservatism; mutually, but also polemically within their own camps, they were all pretty much the best of enemies."

=== United States of America, 19th century ===
In the United States of the mid-nineteenth century, the phrase "the isms" was used as a collective derogatory term to lump together the radical social reform movements of the day (such as slavery abolitionism, feminism, alcohol prohibitionism, Fourierism, pacifism, Technoism, early socialism, etc.) and various spiritual or religious movements considered non-mainstream by the standards of the time (such as transcendentalism, spiritualism, Mormonism etc.).

=== American South, 19th century ===
Southerners often prided themselves on the American South being free from all of these pernicious "isms" (except for alcohol temperance campaigning, which was compatible with a traditional Protestant focus on individual morality). So on September 5 and 9, 1856, the Examiner newspaper of Richmond, Virginia, ran editorials on "Our Enemies, the Isms and their Purposes", while in 1858 Parson Brownlow called for a "Missionary Society of the South, for the Conversion of the Freedom Shriekers, Spiritualists, Free-lovers, Fourierites, and Infidel Reformers of the North" (see The Freedom-of-thought Struggle in the Old South by Clement Eaton).

=== Western world, 20th to 21st century ===
In the present day, the term appears in the title of a standard survey of political thought, Today's Isms by William Ebenstein, first published in the 1950s, and now in its 11th edition.

Skeptics of any given -isms can quote the dictum attributed to Eisenhower: "All -isms are wasms".

In 2004, the Oxford English Dictionary added two new draft definitions of -isms to reference their relationship to words that convey injustice:

- "Forming nouns with the sense 'belief in the superiority of one—over another'; as racism, sexism, speciesism, etc."
- "Forming nouns with the sense 'discrimination or prejudice against on the basis of—'; as ageism, bodyism, heightism, faceism, lookism, sizeism, weightism, etc."

In December 2015, Merriam-Webster Dictionary declared -ism to be the Word of the Year.

== See also ==
For examples of the use of -ism as a suffix:

- List of philosophies
- Glossary of philosophy
- List of political ideologies
- List of art movements
- Discrimination § Types
- Vandalism
- Cannibalism
- Voyeurism
- Terrorism
