= Legal naturalism (Taiwo) =

Concept in social philosophy

Legal naturalism is a term coined by Olufemi Taiwo to describe a current in the social philosophy of Karl Marx which can be interpreted as one of natural law. Taiwo considered it the manifestation of Natural Law in a dialectical materialist context. The concept recognizes the existence of legal priorities or principles, which form an intrinsic part of an economic system.

Taiwo distinguished legal naturalism from Marxism by faulting the latter's bifurcation of the canon between the economic "substructure" of a society and the humanitarian, moral, cultural "superstructure". However, he acknowledged that legal naturalism is, ultimately, "a novel synthesis of the Marxist theory with the natural law theory". According to Taiwo, legal naturalism is both natural law and positive law, constituting a duality of legal existence. The theory is distinctive from other theories under naturalism in the sense that it views natural law as part of social formation or mode of production.

A related concept to legal naturalism is iusnaturalism, which holds that the ideas of nature and divinity or reason validate natural and positive laws.

== See also ==
- Marxism
- Legal positivism
- Natural law

== Books ==
- Legal Naturalism: A Marxist Theory of Law (Olufemi Taiwo, Cornell University Press, 1996) ISBN 0-8014-2851-3
