= Philosophical theory =

Systematic framework for addressing philosophical questions

A philosophical theory is a view that attempts to explain or account for a particular problem in philosophy. The use of the term "theory" is a statement of colloquial English and not a technical term. While any sort of thesis or opinion may be termed a position, in analytic philosophy it is thought best to reserve the word "theory" for systematic, comprehensive attempts to solve problems.

== Overview ==
The elements that comprise a philosophical position consist of statements which are believed to be true by the thinkers who accept them, and which may or may not be empirical. The sciences have a very clear idea of what a theory is; however in the arts such as philosophy, the definition is more hazy. Philosophical positions are not necessarily scientific theories, although they may consist of both empirical and non-empirical statements.

The collective statements of all philosophical movements, schools of thought, and belief systems consist of philosophical positions. Also included among philosophical positions are many principles, dogmas, doctrines, hypotheses, rules, paradoxes, laws, as well as 'ologies, 'isms, 'sis's, and effects.

Some examples of philosophical positions include:

- Metatheory; positions about the formation and content of theorems, such as Kurt Gödel's incompleteness theorem.
- Political theory; positions that underlie a political philosophy, such as John Rawls' theory of justice.
- Ethical theory and meta-ethics; positions about the nature and purpose of ethical statements, such as the ethical theory of Immanuel Kant.
- Critical theory; in its narrow sense, a Western European body of Frankfurt School Marxist thought that aims at criticizing and transforming, rather than merely explaining, social structures. In a broader sense, "critical theory" relates to a wide variety of political, literary, and philosophical positions that take at least some of their inspiration from the Frankfurt School and its dialectic, and that typically contest the possibility of objectivity or aloofness from political positions and privileges.

Philosophical positions may also take the form of a religion, philosophy of life, ideology, world view, or life stance.

== See also ==
- Glossary of philosophy
- List of philosophies
- Metaphilosophy
