= Communalism =

Communalism may refer to:

- African communalism, a system of interdependence in rural Africa
- Christian communism, form of religious communism based on Christianity
- Communalism (Bookchin), a theory of government in which autonomous communities form confederations
- Communalism (historiography), a historical method that follows the development of communities
- Communalism (South Asia), violence across ethnic or communal boundaries
- The type of property ownership pursued in some planned, socially-cohesive, residential communities.
- Medieval communalism, a system of mutual allegiance and defense between cities in the European Middle Ages
- Municipalism, governance by a region's local administrative division
- Democratic confederalism, otherwise known as Kurdish communalism

== See also ==
- Intercommunalism, uniting liberated communities together against imperialism
- Communal (disambiguation)
