= Inductionism =

Concept in philosophy of science

In philosophy of science, Inductionism is a school of thought that believes that scientific laws are "induced" from sets of data. As an example, one might measure the strength of electrical forces at varying distances from charges and induce the inverse square law of electrostatics. This concept is considered one of the two pillars of the old view of the philosophy of science, together with verifiability. An application of inductionism can show how experimental evidence can confirm or inductively justify the belief in generalization and the laws of nature.

== Origin and development ==
Some aspects of induction has been credited to Aristotle. For example, in Prior Analytics, he proposed an inductive syllogism, which served to establish the primary and immediate proposition. For scholars, this constitutes the principle of demonstrative science. The Greek philosopher, however, did not develop a detailed theory of induction. Some sources even state that the Aristotelian conceptualization of induction is different from its modern mainstream interpretations due to its position that inductive arguments are deductively valid.

The early form of modern inductionism is associated with the philosophies of thinkers such as Francis Bacon. This can be demonstrated in the way Bacon favored the steady and incremental collection of empirical evidence using a method that derives general principles from the senses and particulars, gradually leading to the most general principles.

Inductionism is also said to be based on Newtonian physics. This is evident in Isaac Newton's Rule of Reasoning in Philosophy, which articulated his belief that it is imperative to cover the unobservably small features of the world through a methodology that has a strong empirical base. Here, the speculative hypothesis was replaced by induction from premises obtained through observation and experiment.

== Opposing views ==
It is noted that no law of science can be considered mere inductive generalization of facts because each law does not exist in isolation. This is for, instance, demonstrated by thinkers such as John Stuart Mill, who maintained that inductionism is the initial act in the formulation of a general law using the deductive approaches to science. There are thinkers who propose a model that is considered anti-inductionism. These include Karl Popper, who argued that science could progress without making any use of induction and that there is a fundamental asymmetry between induction and deduction.

== See also ==
- Inductive reasoning – Method of logical reasoning
- Abductive reasoning – Inference seeking the simplest and most likely explanation
