= Communal =

Communal may refer to:

- A commune or also intentional community
- Communalism (Bookchin)
- Communalism (South Asia), the South Asian sectarian ideologies
- Relating to an administrative division called comune
- Sociality in animals
- Community ownership
- Communal apartment

== See also ==
- Communalism (disambiguation)
