= Polylogism =

Belief that different groups have different ways of reasoning

Polylogism is the belief that different groups of people reason in fundamentally different ways (coined from Greek poly 'many' + logos 'logic'). The term is attributed to Ludwig von Mises, who claimed that it described Marxism and other class-based social philosophies. In the Misesian sense of the term, a polylogist ascribes different forms of "logic" to different groups, which may include groups based on race, gender, class, or time period.

== Types of polylogism ==
A polylogist would claim that different groups reason in fundamentally different ways: they use different "logics" for deductive inference. Normative polylogism is the claim that these different logics are equally valid. Descriptive polylogism is an empirical claim about different groups, but a descriptive polylogism need not claim equal validity for different "logics". That is, a descriptive polylogist may insist on a universally valid deductive logic while claiming as an empirical matter that some groups use other (incorrect) reasoning strategies.

An adherent of polylogism in the Misesian sense would be a normative polylogist. A normative polylogist might approach an argument by demonstrating how it was correct within a particular logical construct, even if it were incorrect within the logic of the analyst. As Mises noted "this never has been and never can be attempted by anybody."

=== Proletarian logic ===
The term 'proletarian logic' is sometimes taken as evidence of polylogism. This term is usually traced back to Joseph Dietzgen in his 11th letter on logic. Dietzgen is the now obscure philosophical monist of the 19th century who coined the term 'dialectical materialism' and was praised by communist figures such as Karl Marx and V. I. Lenin. His work has received modern attention primarily from the philosopher Bertell Ollman. As a monist, Dietzgen insists on a unified treatment of mind and matter. As Simon Boxley puts it, for Dietzgen "thought is as material an event as any other". This means that logic too has "material" underpinnings. (But note that Dietzgen's "materialism" was explicitly not a physicalism.)

=== Racialist polylogism ===
Racialist polylogism is often identified with the Nazi era. It has been proposed that the ferment around Einstein's theory of relativity is an example of racialist polylogism. Some of the criticisms of relativity theory were mixed with racialist resistance that characterized the physics as an embodiment of Jewish ideology. (For example, Nobel Prize winner Philipp Lenard claimed scientific thought was conditioned by "blood and race", and he accused Werner Heisenberg of teaching "Jewish physics".) Some suggest this appears to be an argument ad hominem, not polylogism, but as the notorious anti-semite and Nobel laureate physicist Philipp Lenard wrote, "There is such a thing as German Physics and Jewish Physics." Modern examples of supposed racialist polylogism are generally misleading. For example, US Supreme Court Justice Sotomayor has been accused of racialist polylogism for suggesting that a "wise Latina" might come to different legal conclusions than a white male. Although generally given the interpretation that life experience can influence one's ability to understand the practical implications of a legal argument, some commentators suggested that Sotomayor supported the idea that Latinas have a unique "logic".

== Comparison to Kuhn's incommensurability ==
Some proponents of polylogism argue that different groups may indeed develop distinct scientific theories and frameworks, drawing on the work of Thomas Kuhn in "The Structure of Scientific Revolutions." Kuhn introduced the concept of paradigm shifts, suggesting that scientific progress is not a linear accumulation of knowledge but rather occurs through revolutionary changes in paradigms. According to this view, a paradigm encompasses the accepted theories, methods, and standards within a scientific community, and when a paradigm shift occurs, the new framework is often incommensurable with the old one, meaning that the two paradigms cannot be directly compared or reconciled.

In this positive context, proponents of polylogism argue that different cultural, social, or ideological groups may operate under entirely distinct paradigms, leading to divergent scientific theories and understandings. The incommensurability of these paradigms implies that what one group considers scientific truth may not be seen as such by another. Therefore, they suggest that scientific theories can be different for different groups, not merely as a matter of interpretation but as fundamentally distinct ways of understanding the world, and that this carries no normative claim alongside it, unlike the way that Misesian polylogism is often used derogatorily.

However Kuhn himself resisted those readings. In his 1969 Postscript, he explicitly warned:

"Incommensurability does not mean incomparability. I have never intended to suggest that scientists cannot communicate across paradigms." (Structure, 2nd ed., Postscript -1969, p. 198)
