= Olúfẹ́mi Táíwò =

Philosopher (born 1956)

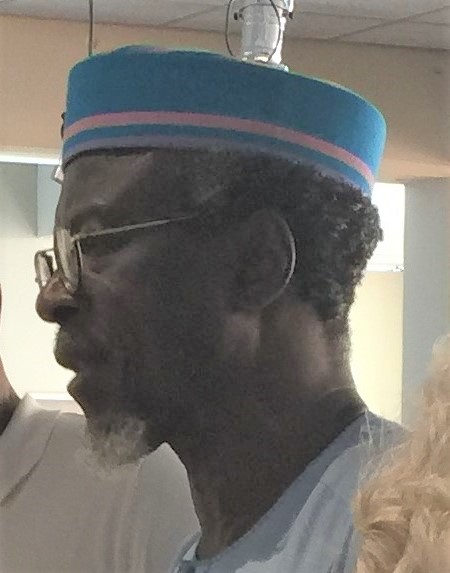
Olúfẹ́mi Táíwò (2023)

Olúfẹ́mi Táíwò (Yoruba: [o.lú.fɛ́.mi tá.í.wò]; born 1956) is a philosopher and professor of African political thought at the Africana Studies Research Center at Cornell University. He was born in Nigeria, where he lived most of his life except for five years in Canada.

== Works ==
- Taiwo, Olufemi (2015) [1996]. Legal Naturalism: A Marxist Theory of Law. Cornell University Press. ISBN 978-1-5017-0173-3.
- Taiwo, Olufemi (2010). How Colonialism Preempted Modernity in Africa. Indiana University Press. ISBN 978-0-253-22130-8.
- Táíwò, Olúfémi (2014). Africa Must Be Modern: A Manifesto. Indiana University Press. ISBN 978-0-253-01278-4.
- Taiwo, Olufemi (2023). Against Decolonisation. Taking African Agency Seriously. London, Hurst, 2022. ISBN 9781787386921
