= Elizabeth Harman =

Elizabeth Harman may refer to:

- Elizabeth Harman (philosopher), daughter of Gilbert Harman
- Elizabeth Longford (1906–2002), née Elizabeth Harman, British author
- Elizabeth Harman (vice-chancellor), vice-chancellor of Victoria University, Australia
- Elizabeth M. Harman (born 1973), U.S. federal official
