= The Moral Problem =

- 1st edition
- Author: Michael Andrew Smith
- Language: English
- Subject: moral realism
- Published: 1994
- Publisher: Wiley-Blackwell
- Publication place: United States
- Media type: Print
- Pages: 242
- ISBN: 978-0631192466

The Moral Problem is a 1994 book by Michael Andrew Smith, in which the author tries to provide a defense of moral realism. It is Smith’s most influential work for which he was awarded an American Philosophical Association book prize in 2001.

== Reception ==
The book was reviewed by James Dreier, David Copp and James Lenman. It has more than four thousand citations on Google Scholar.
