= R. Jay Wallace =

American philosophy professor

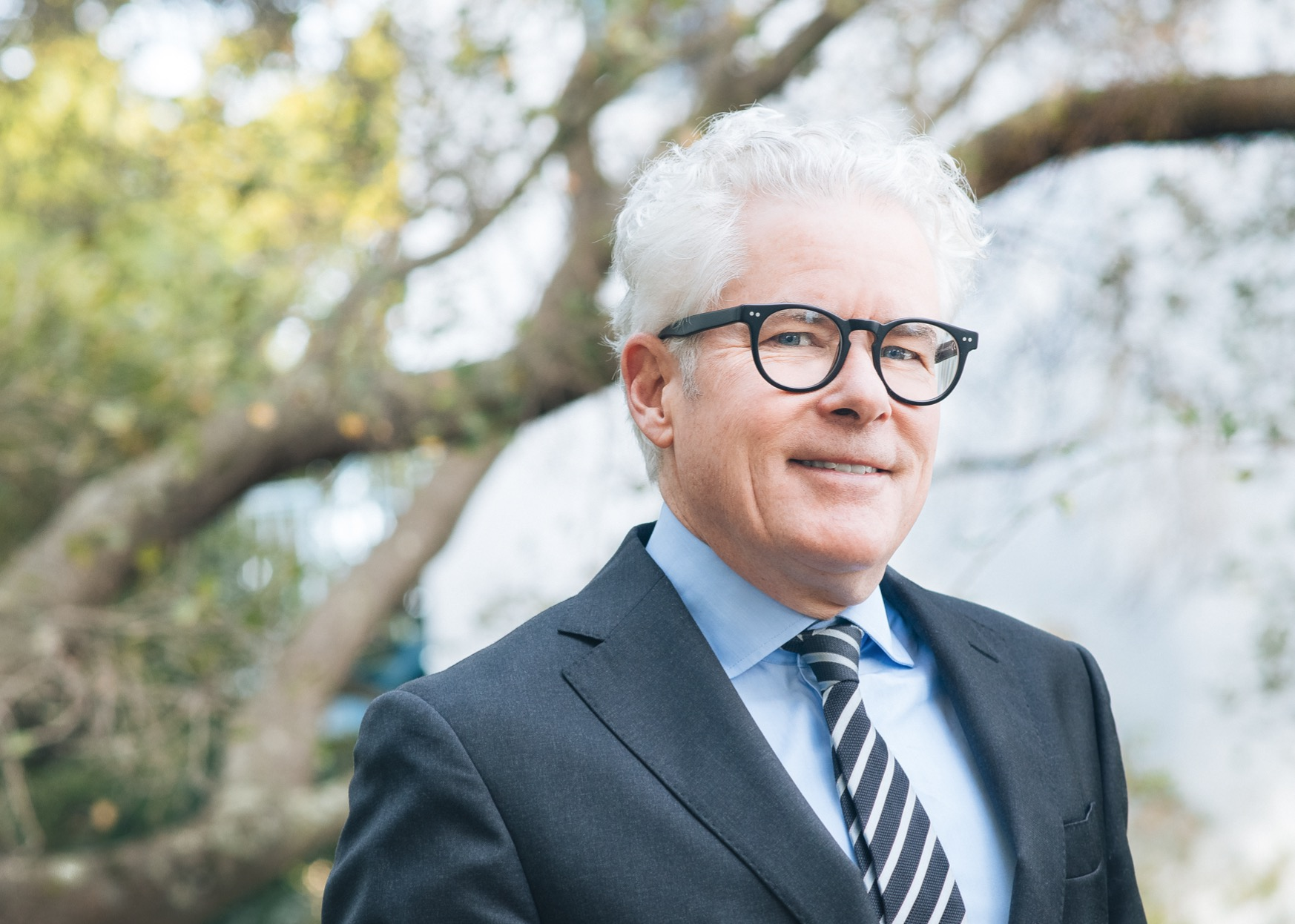
- Wallace in 2019
- Born: 1957 (age 68–69)

Education
- Education: Princeton University (Ph.D.)
- Thesis: Practical Reason and the Claims of Morality: On the Idea of Rationalism in Ethics (1988)
- Doctoral advisor: Gilbert Harman

Philosophical work
- Era: 21st-century philosophy
- Region: Western philosophy
- Doctoral students: Elif Özmen
- Main interests: Moral Philosophy
- Website: https://www.rjaywallace.net

R. Jay Wallace (born 1957) is Distinguished Professor of Philosophy and William and Trudy Ausfahl Chair at the University of California, Berkeley. His areas of specialization include moral philosophy and philosophy of action. He is most noted for his work on practical reason, moral psychology, and meta-ethics.

== Education and career ==
Wallace received his B.A. degree in 1979 from Williams College. He earned the degree of B.Phil. from the University of Oxford in 1983. In 1988, he got his Ph.D. from Princeton University.

He has taught philosophy at the University of Pennsylvania (1988-1996), and the Humboldt-Universität zu Berlin (1996-2000), joining the Berkeley faculty in 1999. He has held visiting positions at the Universität Bielefeld, in the Research School of Social Sciences (RSSS) at the Australian National University, at the Humboldt-Universität zu Berlin, and at the University of Canterbury in Christchurch (New Zealand). He was the department chair at UC Berkeley from 2005 to 2010. He declined the position of White's Professor of Moral Philosophy at Oxford University in 2013.

He was elected a Fellow of the American Academy of Arts & Sciences in 2021.

== Philosophy ==
In his first major book, Responsibility and the Moral Sentiments, Wallace defended a view associated with P.F. Strawson according to which attributions of moral praise and blame do not depend on metaphysical claims about freedom of the will but on our moral practices. The philosopher Annette Baier wrote that “This beautifully organized and lucidly argued book might be taken as a model of how a sustained philosophical argument should proceed. Wallace’s thesis is that our practices of holding persons responsible for their choices and actions, and reacting to those that offend against moral norms with blame, indignation or resentment, make perfectly good sense, even if determinism is true."

His collection of papers, Normativity and the Will, brings together essays mostly written in the decade after the 1996 book Responsibility and the Moral Sentiments, which "develop the moral psychology behind his Strawsonian account of moral responsibility as depending on our practices of holding people morally accountable."

His 2013 book, The View from Here, was described by Thomas Nagel in the London Review of Books as follows: "This interesting, careful and occasionally outrageous book explores the complex interaction and competition between the attitudes of affirmation and regret that are almost inevitable as we look back on our lives and celebrate or deplore the conditions and choices that have made us what we are – that underlie our successes and failures, and our personal attachments."

In 2019 he published The Moral Nexus, which defends a relational interpretation of the domain of interpersonal morality. In his review of the book, Rahul Kumar calls it "a major contribution to moral theory", writing that it "brilliantly explores, with nuance and in detail, the reasons embedded in ordinary moral thought that undergird the appeal of a relational interpretation of moral reasoning."

== Selected publications ==
=== Books ===
- Responsibility and the Moral Sentiments (Cambridge, Mass.: Harvard University Press, 1994; paperback edition 1998).
- Normativity and the Will. Selected Essays on Moral Psychology and Practical Reason (Oxford: Clarendon Press, 2006).
- The View from Here: On Affirmation, Attachment, and the Limits of Regret (Oxford: Oxford University Press, 2013).
- The Moral Nexus (Princeton, New Jersey: Princeton University Press, 2019).

=== Edited books ===
- Ethical Issues in Social Science Research, co-edited with Tom Beauchamp, Ruth Faden, and Leroy Walters (Baltimore: Johns Hopkins University Press, 1982).
- Reason, Emotion and Will (Aldershot: Ashgate Publishing Company, 1999).
- The Practice of Value, by Joseph Raz, with commentaries by Christine Korsgaard, Robert Pippin, and Bernard Williams (Oxford: Clarendon Press, 2003).
- Reason and Value: Themes from the Moral Philosophy of Joseph Raz, co-edited with Philip Pettit, Samuel Scheffler, and Michael Smith (Oxford: Clarendon Press, 2004).

=== Selected articles ===
- "How to Argue about Practical Reason," Mind 99 (July 1990), pp. 355–385.
- "Reason and Responsibility," in Garrett Cullity and Berys Gaut, eds., Ethics and Practical Reason (Oxford: Clarendon Press, 1997), pp. 321–344.
- "Three Conceptions of Rational Agency," Ethical Theory and Moral Practice 2 (1999), pp. 217–242.
- "Addiction as Defect of the Will: Some Philosophical Reflections," Law and Philosophy 18 (1999), pp. 621–654.
- "Normativity, Commitment, and Instrumental Reason," Philosophers' Imprint 1, no. 3 (December 2001), URL = Normativity, Commitment, and Instrumental Reason
- "Promises and Practices Revisited," co-authored with Niko Kolodny, Philosophy and Public Affairs 31 (Spring 2003), pp. 119–154.
- "Practical Reason," The Stanford Encyclopedia of Philosophy, Edward N. Zalta (ed.), URL = The Stanford Encyclopedia of Philosophy
- "Explanation, Deliberation, and Reasons," Philosophy and Phenomenological Research 67 (2003), pp. 429–435.
- "The Rightness of Acts and the Goodness of Lives," in R. Jay Wallace, Philip Pettit, Samuel Scheffler, and Michael Smith, eds., Reason and Value: Themes from the Moral Philosophy of Joseph Raz (Oxford: Clarendon Press, 2004), pp. 385–411.
- "Moral Motivation", in James Dreier, ed., Contemporary Debates in Moral Theory (Oxford: Blackwell Publishing, 2005).
