= Amorality =

Lack or absence of morality

Amorality (also known as amoralism) is an absence of, indifference towards, disregard for, or incapacity for morality. Some simply refer to it as a case of being neither moral nor immoral. The word amoral can be conflated with immoral, which refers to an agent doing or thinking something they know or believe to be wrong.

Morality and amorality in humans and other animals is a subject of dispute among scientists and philosophers. Human capabilities may be thought of as amoral in that they can be used for either constructive or destructive purposes, i.e., for good or for ill.

There is a position which claims that amorality is just another form of morality or a concept that is close to it, citing moral naturalism, moral constructivism, moral relativism, and moral fictionalism as constructs that resemble key aspects of amorality.

== Inanimate objects ==
One may consider any entity that is not sapient amoral. For example, a rock may be used (by rational agents) for good or bad purposes, but the rock itself is neither good nor bad. In ontological philosophy, the ancient gnostic concept that the material world was inherently evil applied morality to existence itself and was a point of concern in early Christianity in the form of Docetism, as it opposed the notion that creation is good, as stated in The Book of Genesis.

== Legal entities ==
Corporations are thought by some to be amoral entities. This can refer to the "ethical numbness" of these organizations' executives and managers, especially when approached from the view that corporations can be considered moral agents as well as a kind of legal person.

== See also ==
- Capacity (law)
- Moral nihilism
- Moral psychology
- Anomie
- Value judgment
