= Moral Relativism and Moral Objectivity =

1996 book by Gilbert Harman and Judith Jarvis Thomson

- Author: Gilbert Harman, Judith Jarvis Thomson
- Language: English
- Subject: moral relativism
- Published: 1996
- Publisher: Basil Blackwell
- Media type: Print
- Pages: 240
- ISBN: 978-0-631-19211-4

Moral Relativism and Moral Objectivity is a 1996 book by Gilbert Harman and Judith Jarvis Thomson, in which Harman tries to provide a defense of moral relativism and Thomson tries to refute it.

== Reception ==
The book was reviewed by L. Gordon Graham, Simon Blackburn, Margaret Gilbert and Hans Oberdiek. Michael A. Smith calls it "an introduction to meta-ethics of the very best kind."
