= Moral nihilism =

Philosophical view that nothing is morally right or wrong

Moral nihilism (also called ethical nihilism) is the metaethical view that nothing is morally right or morally wrong and that morality does not exist.

Moral nihilism is distinct from moral relativism, which allows for actions to be wrong relative to a particular culture or individual. It is also distinct from expressivism, which asserts that moral claims are expressions of emotions, desires, and intents.

Moral nihilism today broadly tends to take the form of an error theory: the view developed originally by J. L. Mackie in his 1977 book Ethics: Inventing Right and Wrong, although prefigured by Axel Hägerström in 1911. Error theory and nihilism broadly take the form of a negative claim about the existence of objective values or properties. Under traditional views, some moral properties or methods hold objectively in some sense beyond our contingent interests, which morally obligate us to act. For Mackie and the error theorists, such properties do not exist in the world, and therefore, morality conceived of by reference to objective facts must also not exist. Therefore, morality in the traditional sense does not exist.

However, holding nihilism does not necessarily imply that one should give up using moral or ethical language; some nihilists contend that it remains a useful tool. In fact Mackie and other contemporary defenders of error theory, such as Richard Joyce and Jonas Olson, defend the use of moral or ethical talk and action even in knowledge of their fundamental falsity. The legitimacy of this activity is a subject of debate in philosophy.

== Forms of nihilism ==
Moral nihilists agree that all claims, such as "murder is morally wrong" are not true. But different nihilistic views differ in two ways.

Some may say that such claims are neither true nor false; others say that they are all false.

Nihilists differ in the scope of their theories. Error theorists typically claim that it is only distinctively moral claims which are false; practical nihilists claim that there are no reasons for action of any kind; some nihilists extend this claim to include reasons for belief.

=== Ethical language: false versus not truth-apt ===
J. L. Mackie argues that moral assertions are only true if there are moral properties, but because there are none, all such claims are false. Under such a view, moral propositions that express beliefs are then systematically in error. For Mackie's view, if there are to be moral properties, they must be objective and therefore not amenable to differences in subjective desires and preferences. Moreover, Mackie claims that these moral properties, if they did exist, would need to be intrinsically motivating by being in some primitive relation to our consciousness. They must be able to guide us morally just by the fact of being in some clear awareness of their truth.

Other versions of the theory claim that moral assertions are not true because they are neither true nor false. This form of moral nihilism claims that moral beliefs and assertions presuppose the existence of moral facts that do not exist. Consider, for example, the claim that the present king of France is bald. Some argue that this claim is neither true nor false because it presupposes that there is currently a king of France, but there is not. The claim suffers from "presupposition failure". Richard Joyce argues for this form of moral nihilism under the name "fictionalism".

=== The scope question ===
Error theory is built on three principles:

1. There are no moral features in this world; nothing is right or wrong.
2. Therefore, no moral judgments are true.
3. However, our sincere moral judgments try, but always fail, to describe the moral features of things.

Thus, we always lapse into error when thinking in moral terms. We are trying to state the truth when we make moral judgments. But since there is no moral truth, all of our moral claims are mistaken. Hence the error. These three principles lead to the conclusion that there is no moral knowledge. Knowledge requires truth. If there is no moral truth, there can be no moral knowledge. Thus, moral values are purely chimerical.

== Applied ethics ==
A pressing question is how one might apply the belief that there are no objective morals. Perhaps the most common response, and the position which Mackie adopts, is to view moralizing as an inherently useful practice, and that everyone is better off behaving in a moralistic manner.

On the other hand, Richard Garner advocated for the idea of "moral abolitionism". He argues that, if one were to believe that there are no objective morals, then to engage in moralism is a deceptive behavior. It is wrong because it harms one's epistemological integrity. Furthermore, by refusing to make moral judgements generally, people would be more likely to engage with others in a more genuine fashion. The social benefit is that "we will find that there will be less to argue about, and that our conflicts and disagreements with others, at last seen for what they are, can be addressed and resolved". Garner encouraged people to adhere to an alternative to traditional normative morality: "informed, compassionate amoralism", a blend of compassion, non-duplicity, and clarity of language that he believed would nurture our capability for tolerance, creation, and cooperation.

== Arguments for nihilism ==
=== Argument from queerness ===
The most prominent argument for nihilism is the argument from queerness.

J. L. Mackie argues that there are no objective ethical values, by arguing that they would be queer (strange):

If there were objective values, then they would be entities or qualities or relations of a very strange sort, utterly different from anything else in the universe.

For all those who also find such entities queer (prima facie implausible), there is reason to doubt the existence of objective values.

In his book Morality without Foundations: A Defense of Ethical Contextualism (1999), Mark Timmons provides a reconstruction of Mackie's views in the form of the two related arguments. These are based on the rejection of properties, facts, and relationships that do not fit within the worldview of philosophical naturalism, the idea "that everything—including any particular events, facts, properties, and so on—is part of the natural physical world that science investigates" (1999, p. 12). Timmons adds, "The undeniable attraction of this outlook in contemporary philosophy no doubt stems from the rise of modern science and the belief that science is our best avenue for discovering the nature of reality".

There are several ways in which moral properties are said to be queer:

- our ordinary moral discourse purports to refer to intrinsically prescriptive properties and facts "that would somehow motivate us or provide us with reasons for action independent of our desires and aversions"—but such properties and facts do not comport with philosophical naturalism.
- given that objective moral properties supposedly supervene upon natural properties (such as biological or psychological properties), the relation between the moral properties and the natural properties is metaphysically mysterious and does not comport with philosophical naturalism.
- a moral realist who countenances the existence of metaphysically queer properties, facts, and relations must also posit some special faculty by which we have knowledge of them.

==== Responses and criticisms ====
Christine Korsgaard responds to Mackie by saying:

Of course there are entities that meet these criteria. It's true that they are queer sorts of entities and that knowing them isn't like anything else. But that doesn't mean that they don't exist. ... For it is the most familiar fact of human life that the world contains entities that can tell us what to do and make us do it. They are people, and the other animals.

Other criticisms of the argument include noting that the very fact that such entities would have to be something fundamentally different from what we normally experience, therefore assumably outside our sphere of experience, we cannot prima facie have reason to either doubt or affirm their existence. Therefore if one had independent grounds for supposing such things to exist (such as a reductio ad absurdum of the contrary) the argument from queerness cannot give one any particular reason to think otherwise. An argument along these lines has been provided by, e.g., Akeel Bilgrami.

Ian and Myles King argue that quantum phenomena have been shown to share several of the unusual characteristics of ethical entities. The observer effect, quantum entanglement, the wave-particle duality of light, and other phenomena appear to share properties with aspects of ethics.

=== Argument from explanatory impotence ===
Gilbert Harman argued that we do not need to posit the existence of objective values in order to explain our "moral observations".

== See also ==
- Antinomianism
- Deontology
- Eliminativism
- Egoist anarchism
- Evolution of morality
- Existential nihilism
- Illegalism
- Non-cognitivism
- Metaethics
- Might makes right
- Moral relativism
- Moral skepticism
- Perspectivism
- Psychological determinism
- Reductionism
- Transcendental nihilism

== Bibliography ==
- Pratt, Alan (n.d.). "Nihilism". Internet Encyclopedia of Philosophy. ISSN 2161-0002.
- Bilgrami, Akeel (2006). Self-Knowledge and Resentment. Cambridge: Harvard University Press.
- Harman, Gilbert (1977). The Nature of Morality: An Introduction to Ethics. New York: Oxford University Press. ISBN 9780195021431. OCLC 2725781.
- Joyce, Richard (2001). The Myth of Morality. Cambridge and New York: Cambridge University Press. ISBN 9780511328787.
- Korsgaard, Christine (1996). The Sources of Normativity. Cambridge and New York: Cambridge University Press.
- Mackie, John (1977). Ethics: Inventing Right and Wrong. London: Penguin. ISBN 0140135588. OCLC 24729622.
- Olson, Jonas (2014). Moral Error Theory: History, Critique, Defence. Oxford University Press.
- Shafer-Landau, Russ (2010). The Fundamentals of Ethics. New York: Oxford University Press. ISBN 978-0-19-063139-0.
- Shafer-Landau, Russ (2018). The Fundamentals of Ethics (fourth ed.). Oxford University Press. ISBN 978-0-19-532086-2.
- Sinnott-Armstrong, Walter (2019), "Moral Skepticism", in Zalta, Edward N. (ed.), The Stanford Encyclopedia of Philosophy (Summer 2019 ed.), Metaphysics Research Lab, Stanford University
- Timmons, Mark (1999). Morality without Foundations: A Defense of Ethical Contextualism. Oxford and New York: Oxford University Press.
