= Constructivism in Practical Philosophy =

2012 book edited by James Lenman and Yonatan Shemmer

- First edition
- Authors: James Lenman and Yonatan Shemmer
- Language: English
- Subject: ethics
- Publisher: Oxford University Press
- Publication date: 2012
- Media type: Print (Hardback)
- Pages: 262 pp.
- ISBN: 9780199609833

Constructivism in Practical Philosophy is a 2012 book edited by James Lenman and Yonatan Shemmer, presenting twelve papers on moral constructivism.

== Contributors ==
- Michael E. Bratman
- Dale Dorsey
- Nadeem J. Z. Hussain
- Aaron James
- James Lenman
- Michael Ridge
- Yonatan Shemmer
- Robert Stern
- Sharon Street
- T. M. Scanlon
- Valerie Tiberius
- R. Jay Wallace
