= Korsgaard (surname) =

Korsgaard is a surname. Notable people with the surname include:

- Christine Korsgaard (born 1952), American philosopher
- Jeppe Jul Korsgaard (born 1997), Danish ice hockey player
- Lasse Jul Korsgaard (born 1994), Danish ice hockey player
- Lea Korsgaard (born 1979), Danish journalist and administrator
- Mads Korsgaard (born 1979), Danish actor
- Mette Korsgaard (born 1958), Danish journalist and director
- Ove Korsgaard (born 1942), Danish author and professor
- Thomas Korsgaard (born 1995), Danish author
- Vagn Korsgaard (1921–2012), Danish engineer and inventor

== See also ==
- Jørgen Korsgaard-Pedersen (born 1932), Danish ambassador in Egypt, Sudan, Somalia, Poland and Australia
