= Gene Andrew Jarrett =

American professor and academic administrator

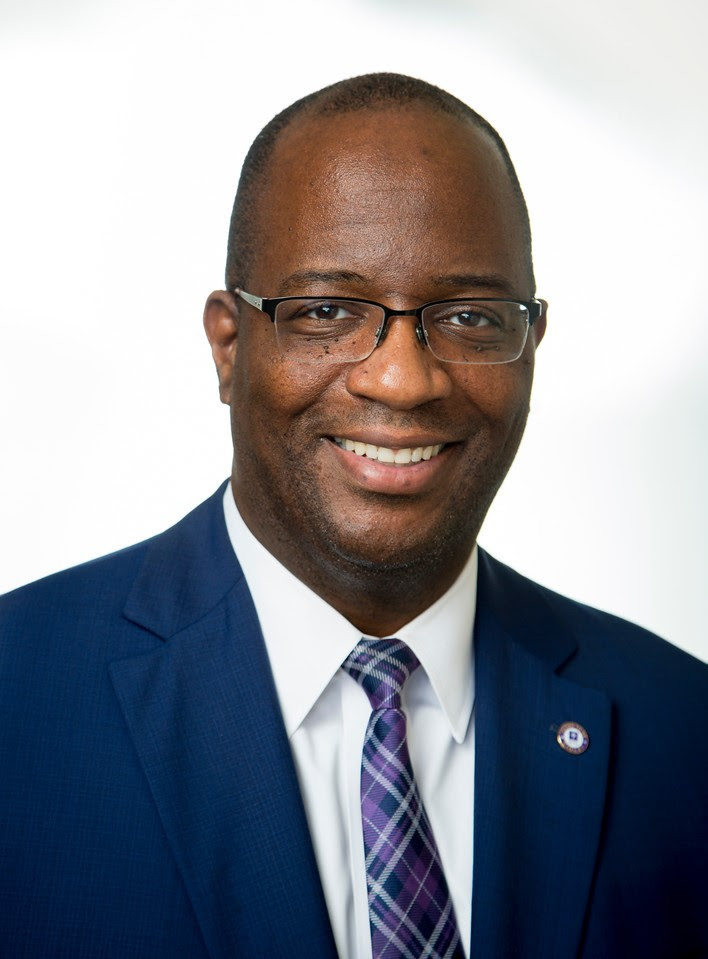
- Born: April 21, 1975 (age 51); New York City, U.S.
- Education: Princeton University (AB); Brown University (AM, PhD)
- Organization: Princeton University
- Title: Dean of the Faculty and William S. Tod Professor of English
- Predecessor: Sanjeev Kulkarni
- Awards: Walter Jackson Bate Fellowship from the Radcliffe Institute for Advanced Study at Harvard University; ACLS Fellowship from the American Council of Learned Societies; Truman Capote Award for Literary Criticism
- Website: geneandrewjarrett.com

Gene Andrew Jarrett (born April 21, 1975) is an American professor, literary scholar, and academic administrator. He is Dean of the Faculty and William S. Tod Professor of English at Princeton University.

Prior to his current role at Princeton, Jarrett was the Seryl Kushner Dean of the College of Arts and Science (CAS) and Professor of English at New York University. Prior to that, he worked at Boston University, where he served as Chair of the English Department from 2011 to 2014 and Associate Dean of the Faculty for the Humanities from 2014 to 2017. At BU he was a professor in the Department of English and the Program in African American Studies. Before that, he was a professor in the English Department at the University of Maryland, College Park.

Jarrett is the author of three books of African American literary studies, and the editor or co-editor of eight additional books of African American literature and literary criticism. He is the founding editor-in-chief of the Oxford Bibliographies module on African American Studies, published by Oxford University Press. For his scholarly work he has won a number of awards and distinguished fellowships, including the Truman Capote Award for Literary Criticism.

== Early life and education ==
Jarrett was born on April 21, 1975, in New York City. His parents instilled him with strong values of hard work and education. "They were always talking about how education is a pathway toward opportunities," he mentioned in an interview. "My father used to say to me: the harder you work, the luckier you get."

Jarrett attended Stuyvesant High School, where he explored his dual academic interests in English and Mathematics. The long commute from the Bronx and challenging curriculum were obstacles that "you just had to persevere through," he remembered. Despite the obstacles, he recalled Stuyvesant High School fondly. "[At Stuyvesant], there were a lot of people who excelled in their studies and it made me appreciate how important it was to bring a certain degree of intellectual intensity and energy to whatever I did."

In 1993, Jarrett matriculated at Princeton University. Since Princeton does not allow students to have more than one concentration, he earned three certificates of proficiency in American Studies, African American Studies, and Applied and Computational Mathematics. Jarrett graduated with an A.B. in English after completing a 95-page-long senior thesis, titled "The Narrative Economy of Race in the Novels of William Faulkner," under the supervision of Eduardo Cadava. Jarrett was drawn especially to African American studies: "Because I am a person of African descent, the issues regarding race and culture interested me in terms of understanding the world in which I lived and gave me a chance to learn more about myself."

While at Princeton Jarrett became a fellow of the Mellon Mays Undergraduate Fellowship Program. "The professional relationships I established as an undergraduate through Mellon Mays have persisted for decades," he recalled. As a student he was especially influenced by the Princeton professors who focused on the lives of African Americans, including philosopher Cornel West, biographer Arnold Rampersad, and the Nobel Laureate Toni Morrison. Morrison was one of his professors during both his junior and senior years. "She had blackboards in her office," he recalled during an interview after she had died on August 5, 2019, "and she would have these kind of looping, perfectly proportional, symmetrical letters, and she would write these gorgeous words." Jarrett said that when he decided to pursue a graduate degree "[Morrison] agreed to write me a letter of recommendation. And so, if it werenʼt for her, I wouldnʼt be where I am today."

By the time Jarrett graduated from Princeton, he had won an Andrew W. Mellon Fellowship in Humanistic Studies and decided to pursue doctoral study in English language and literature at Brown University. After five years at Brown, he earned his doctorate in English in 2002.

== Teaching career ==
As Jarrett was finishing his doctorate at Brown, he received job offers to be an assistant professor of English from Boston University and the University of Maryland, College Park. In 2002, Jarrett chose the University of Maryland to start his career as a professor. He earned tenure there within five years, by the age of 32.

Upon receiving tenure at the University of Maryland, Boston University reached out again. The offer of a tenured professorship in the English Department, with a joint appointment in the Program in African American Studies, finally lured him to BU. Within five years, in early 2012, he was promoted to full professor at the age of 36, making him one of the youngest faculty at that rank in the entire University. After a decade, Jarrett left BU for NYU, where his appointment as Professor of English accompanied his appointment as Seryl Kushner Dean of the College of Arts and Science.

== Academic administration ==
Over the course of his career Jarrett has served in academic administration. His major roles include, in the Boston University College of Arts and Sciences, Interim Director of African American Studies from 2009 to 2010, Chair of the Department of English from 2011 to 2014, and Associate Dean of the Faculty for the Humanities from 2014 to 2017.

As Associate Dean for the Humanities, Jarrett regularly lobbied as a Massachusetts delegate of the National Humanities Alliance on Capitol Hill for greater federal funding of the humanities, which had for years been contending with threatened budget cuts. "The NEH and NEA are crucial for supporting not only the scholarly or creative work of faculty in higher education, especially at BU," he said in 2017, "but they also fund the programming outside of our academic walls, such as public libraries and museums, which advance the early education of children and the civic education of people living in our communities. Slashing the support of these endowments would undercut the robust educational apparatus, with its attention to the diverse and free expression of ideas, that has distinguished our civic society since the Congressional creation of these endowments in 1965."

As academic dean, Jarrett co-chaired BU's Task Force on Faculty Diversity and Inclusion, which was created to encourage University-wide discussions on how to make BU a more diverse, inclusive community for faculty members, and to couple institutional data about underrepresented minorities on the faculty with, as Jarrett put it, "crucial historical background and personal stories about the challenges of recruiting and retaining an excellent and diverse faculty...and about the climate of inclusiveness that is important in higher education and at BU in particular." The task force comprised 18 faculty and staff from both the Charles River Campus and the Medical Campus, and held two dozen sessions across the two campuses, in every school and college, to speak with faculty and students. The conclusion of the report prompted the university to appoint a university-wide associate provost for faculty diversity and inclusion and equivalent officers in each of BU's schools and colleges.

In June 2017, Jarrett was named Seryl Kushner Dean of NYU's College of Arts and Science, and reports to the President and the Provost; his appointment began on September 1, 2017. Among his responsibilities at NYU, Jarrett provides innovative vision and leadership for setting undergraduate academic standards and policies in CAS; updating current and developing new academic programs; and fundraising to improve the access, affordability, and advancement of higher education.

Under Jarrett's leadership, CAS launched the first major and minor undergraduate degrees in data science on the New York City campus of NYU. The courses are provided by the curricular contributions of the Faculty of Arts and Science, the Courant Institute of Mathematical Sciences, and the Center for Data Science. CAS established a partnership with NYU Stern School of Business. Graduating CAS students who apply to and are accepted into the pilot program "NYU x NYU / CAS-Stern Pathway" would automatically receive $10,000 towards the tuition for the full-time, two-year MBA program at NYU Stern. CAS spearheaded NYU's winning of one of 12 institutional mini-grants from the Association of American Universities to improve STEM education. CAS is also seeking to revise its general education requirements, including the Core Curriculum and system of First-Year Seminars, for the first time in over a decade.

During Jarrett's tenure as Dean of CAS at NYU, he also served from 2019 to 2021 as Vice Chair of Deans Council, which "considers matters of educational and administrative policy and makes appropriate recommendations to the President and Chancellor and other University officers. The Deans Council meets regularly to address issues that affect both their individual schools and the University as a whole." In Summer 2021, he was scheduled to begin his two-year term as Chair of Deans Council, but he stepped down to succeed Sanjeev Kulkarni as Dean of the Faculty at Princeton University. His appointment at Princeton began on August 1, 2021.

== Scholarship ==
Jarrett's first book, Deans and Truants: Race and Realism in African American Literature (University of Pennsylvania Press, 2007), came out of his original belief, first widely noted in his article for the Chronicle of Higher Education, that "[a]lthough readers know by heart 'not to judge a book by its cover,' they are still likely to remain superficial and prejudge the content of a book based on the author's skin color." Jarrett's theorizing of "racial realism" has become the basis of a field of inquiry in which "writers of color have historically to be hampered by the narrative structure of realism, a structure that resists the depiction of racial experience." The next book Jarrett wrote, Representing the Race: A New Political History of African American Literature (New York University Press, 2011), parses the myths of authenticity, popular culture, nationalism, and militancy that have come to define African American political activism in recent decades.

Jarrett recently published Paul Laurence Dunbar: The Life and Times of a Caged Bird (Princeton University Press, 2022), a comprehensive biography of Paul Laurence Dunbar, the Dayton-born African American poet of the turn of the 20th century. To support his writing of the biography, in 2010, Jarrett won the Walter Jackson Bate Fellowship in English Literature from the Radcliffe Institute for Advanced Study at Harvard University. Four years later, he won the ACLS Fellowship from the American Council of Learned Societies.

Jarrett's biography of Dunbar won the 2024 Truman Capote Award for Literary Criticism, the largest annual cash prize for English-language literary criticism administered by the Iowa Writers’ Workshop on behalf of the estate of Truman Capote and regarded as the Pulitzer Prize of Literary Criticism. The selection committee noted the impact of Jarrett’s work: “What is particularly powerful in Gene Jarrett's landmark biography of Paul Laurence Dunbar is his emphasis on the cruel paradoxes of the poet's career, particularly how the standard of racial authenticity became 'a cage from which escape remained impossible.' Jarrett's narrative is so absorbing because it tells in novelistic detail of a personal life and literary career that verged on the tragic.”

The three books written by Jarrett have spawned eight additional books of African American literature and literary criticism, including the Wiley-Blackwell Anthology of African American Literature, the first comprehensive anthology of African American literature to be conceived and published for both classroom and online education in the new millennium. Jarrett is the founding Editor-in-Chief of Oxford Bibliographies in African American Studies, a module published online by Oxford University Press, and providing bibliographic articles that identify, organize, cite, and annotate scholarship on key areas of African American Studies—culture, politics, law, history, society, religion, and economics.

== Notable awards and honors ==
- Truman Capote Award for Literary Criticism, 2024
- ACLS Fellowship, American Council of Learned Societies, 2014
- Walter Jackson Bate Fellowship in English Literature, Radcliffe Institute for Advanced Study, Harvard University, 2010
- Andrew W. Mellon Fellowship in Humanistic Studies, Woodrow Wilson National Fellowship Foundation, 1997

== Personal life ==
Gene Andrew Jarrett is married to Renée Boynton-Jarrett, a professor at Boston University School of Medicine. A pediatrician and social epidemiologist, she is the founding director of the Vital Village Community Engagement Network. Both met as first-year students at Princeton University and in a few years got engaged there; they married in 1997. Together they have two daughters and a son.

== Bibliography ==
=== Authored books ===
- Paul Laurence Dunbar: The Life and Times of a Caged Bird (Princeton University Press, 2022)
- Representing the Race: A New Political History of African American Literature (New York University Press, 2011)
- Deans and Truants: Race and Realism in African American Literature (University of Pennsylvania Press, 2007)

=== Edited books ===
- The Wiley-Blackwell Anthology of African American Literature, Volume 1: 1746-1920 (Wiley-Blackwell, 2014)
- The Wiley-Blackwell Anthology of African American Literature, Volume 2: 1920 to the Present (Wiley-Blackwell, 2014)
- A Companion to African American Literature (Blackwell Companions to Literature and Culture Series; Wiley-Blackwell, 2012, 2013)
- The Collected Novels of Paul Laurence Dunbar (Ohio University Press, 2009, 2012); co-edited with Herbert Woodward Martin and Ronald Primeau
- The New Negro: Readings on Race, Representation, and African American Culture (Princeton University Press, 2007); co-edited with Henry Louis Gates, Jr.
- A Long Way from Home, by Claude McKay (Rutgers University Press, 2007)
- African American Literature beyond Race: An Alternative Reader (New York University Press, 2006)
- The Complete Stories of Paul Laurence Dunbar (Ohio University Press, 2005, 2006); Co-edited with Thomas Lewis Morgan; foreword by Shelley Fisher Fishkin

=== Modules ===
- Oxford Bibliographies in African American Studies, ed. Jarrett (New York: Oxford University Press), 2016
