= Michael Tye (philosopher) =

British philosopher (born 1950)

- Born: 1950 (age 75–76)

Education
- Education: University of Oxford; University at Buffalo (PhD)

Philosophical work
- Era: Contemporary philosophy
- Region: Western philosophy
- School: Analytic philosophy Panpsychism
- Institutions: Haverford College; Temple University; University of St Andrews; King's College London; University of Texas at Austin
- Main interests: Philosophy of mind, metaphysics, philosophy of perception
- Notable ideas: PANIC theory of consciousness, representational theory of consciousness

Michael Tye (born 1950) is a British philosopher who is currently the Dallas TACA Centennial Professor in Liberal Arts at the University of Texas at Austin. He has made significant contributions to the philosophy of mind.

== Education and career ==
Tye completed his undergraduate education at Oxford University in England, studying first physics and then physics and philosophy. He went on to complete a PhD in philosophy at the State University of New York, Stony Brook. Before moving to Texas, Tye taught at Haverford College in suburban Philadelphia and Temple University in Philadelphia proper. He was also a visiting professor at King's College, London for some ten consecutive years while at Temple and briefly took up a chair at the University of St. Andrews. In 2023, Tye met with the Dalai Lama in Dharamsala at a conference dedicated to the topic of animal consciousness. Besides philosophy of mind, Tye has interests in cognitive science, metaphysics, and philosophical logic, especially problems relating to vagueness.

Tye's third book, Ten Problems of Consciousness (1995), was a selection of the Library of Science Book Club.

== Representationalism ==
In the philosophy of mind, Tye has dedicated much of his work to the development and defense of representationalism. Representationalism is a thesis about the phenomenal, “qualitative” character of conscious experiences. According to Tye, the most basic version of the representationalist thesis holds that “necessarily (visual) experiences that are alike with respect to the qualities they represent are alike phenomenally.”. Tye has argued for representationalism about conscious experience in general on the grounds that it provides the best explanation of the connection between phenomenal and representational features in experience, the "transparent" character of sensory consciousness, and perceptual accuracy conditions.

In his early work on representationalism, Tye defended materialist views about conscious representation and developed an influential account of phenomenal character known as the "PANIC theory". According to the PANIC theory, “phenomenal character is one and the same as Poised Abstract Nonconceptual Intentional Content.” Tye's proposal precludes the possibility that conceptual states such as beliefs are (or could be) phenomenally conscious. Tye later came to reject the PANIC theory in favor of the view that phenomenal character is nothing other than the cluster of properties represented by an experience (as opposed to being a representational content). In his more recent work, Tye retains his commitment to representationalism while rejecting the claim that phenomenally conscious states can be fully characterized in terms of standard materialist features.

== Color ==
Tye endorses the realist view that “colors are physical properties whose natures are discoverable by empirical investigation.” His work on color has broadly examined the extent to which contemporary science can be reconciled with pre-theoretical convictions about the nature of color. Tye affirms what he calls the “commonsense” belief that colors are objective features of surfaces.

Tye has defended his view of color in print against criticism from Ned Block.

== Animal consciousness ==
Tye has authored papers on animal consciousness and pain in animals. He is the author of the book, Tense Bees and Shell-Shocked Crabs: Are Animals Conscious?, published in 2016. The book defends the hypothesis that consciousness extends a considerable way down the phylogenetic scale, focusing on felt pain as a criterion. He states that, in the absence of defeaters, we should prefer the view that animals feel pain if they behave similarly to humans in contexts where we know that humans feel pain. He has reviewed scientific studies and concludes that mammals, birds, reptiles, fish, and arthropods are, in most cases, likely to be conscious.

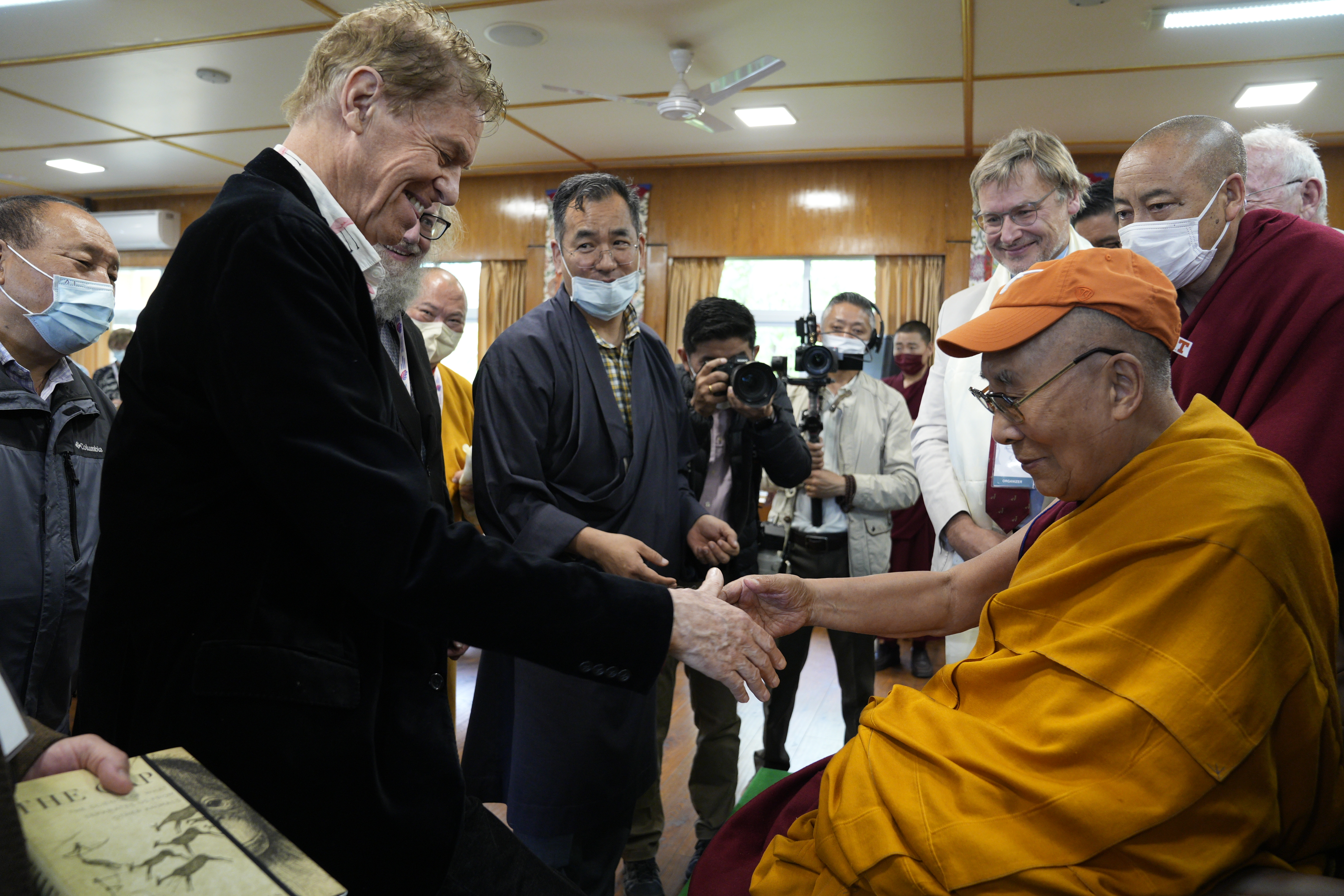
Michael Tye meeting the Dalai Lama at a 2023 conference devoted to the topic of animal consciousness

According to Tye, current evidence suggests that teleost fish feel pain while the evidence for pain in elasmobranchs and certain insects remains inconclusive. Tye has commented that "insects do not react to treatment that would undoubtedly cause severe pain in mammals. So, there is reason to doubt that generally insects feel pain." However, in Chapter 5 of Vagueness And The Evolution Of Consciousness: Through The Looking Glass, Tye favorably considers opposing evidence including cases of apparent pain-behavior in elasmobranchs and insects as well as “striking commonalities in gene pathways in fruit flies and mice, pathways that aid mice in sensing pain and fixing pain thresholds.” In Chapter 11 of Tense Bees and Shell-Shocked Crabs: Are Animals Conscious?, Tye discusses arguments in favor of vegetarianism.

Tense Bees and Shell-Shocked Crabs: Are Animals Conscious? has been reviewed in Metascience and PsycCRITIQUES.

== Panpsychism ==
In his 2021 book, Vagueness And The Evolution Of Consciousness: Through The Looking Glass, Tye abandons an earlier form of physicalism and argues that sensory experience cannot be fully characterized by the resources of standard scientific investigation. On the basis of issues relating to vagueness and the emergence of consciousness, Tye endorses a modified, “panpsychist” form of representationalism. This view holds that fundamental physical particles possess a basic, proto-phenomenal mental property that transfers to representational states when the particles are appropriately arranged. According to his new position, this basic mental property (which Tye refers to as “consciousness*”) is a necessary feature of phenomenally conscious states over and above the representational features described in his previous work.

Tye holds that fundamental physics can only “tell us about the relational/structural properties of matter.” Significantly, these relational/structural properties do not include the intrinsic mental property that he attributes to fundamental particles and conscious states. However, Tye maintains that his proposed property still qualifies as genuinely physical on the grounds that it is “found in things that are unconscious as well as in things that are conscious”, occurs “across all of nature at the most fundamental level”, and obeys “fundamental physical laws”. For this reason, Tye denies that his conversion constitutes an endorsement of anti-physicalism.

== Books ==
- The Metaphysics of Mind (1989)
- The Imagery Debate (1991)
- Ten Problems of Consciousness (1995)
- Consciousness, Color, and Content (2000)
- Consciousness and Persons (2003)
- Consciousness Revisited: Materialism without Phenomenal Concepts (2009)
- Tense Bees and Shell-Shocked Crabs: Are Animals Conscious? (2016)
- Vagueness And The Evolution Of Consciousness: Through The Looking Glass (2021)

== See also ==
- Qualia
- Consciousness
- Naïve realism
- Fred Dretske
- Ned Block
- David Chalmers
- Philosophy of mind
- Mind–body problem
