= Transparency of experience =

Philosophical idea

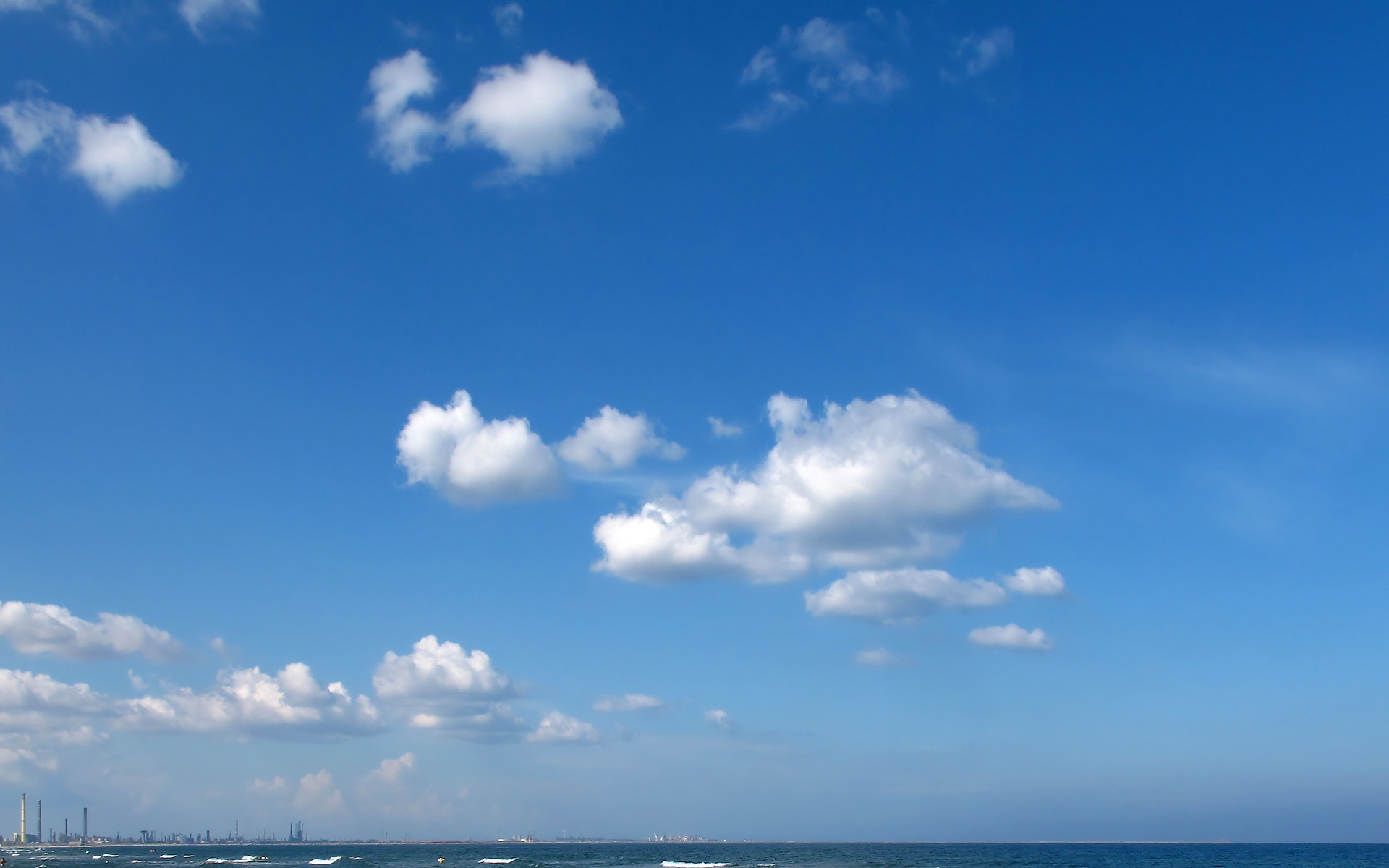
The transparency of experience says that perception presents blueness as a feature of the sky, not a feature of our experience of the sky.

The transparency of experience (Note: Also called the transparency thesis or the diaphanousness of experience.) is the idea in the philosophy of mind that perception and other conscious experiences are phenomenally transparent. This means that experiences like perception present the properties of objects—like the redness of a tomato—but never the properties of experience itself. In this way, it is said that "we see right through" experience, making it difficult or even impossible for introspection to reveal its intrinsic properties.

Philosophers debate whether experience is fully transparent or whether it is sometimes possible to access the properties of experience. Proposed counterexamples in which features of the experience are said to be directly accessible include itches, pains, emotions and moods. The transparency of experience is most commonly accepted for perceptual experiences, particularly visual perception, but proposed counterexamples also include visual experiences like blurred vision. Philosophers also debate what implications the transparency of experience has for the possibility of introspective knowledge.

The transparency of experience has been interpreted in many ways. Most commonly, it is used to argue for the idea that mental experiences are fundamentally representational, a view called intentionalism or representationalism. (Note: Not to be confused with indirect realism, which is sometimes also referred to as representationalism.) This argument is sometimes extended to claim that there are no purely qualitative aspects of experience, or qualia, because all experiences have some representational content. The transparency thesis has also been used to argue for direct realism, disjunctivism, and various other views in the philosophy of mind and philosophy of perception.

The transparency of experience has been traced back to modern philosophy in the writings of Thomas Reid, but it became more prominent in twentieth century philosophy due to famous passages in the works of G. E. Moore and Gilbert Harman.

== Background ==
Traditionally, philosophers have identified two separate aspects of experience: a representational aspect and a sensational aspect. The representational aspect, which is called intentionality, is an experience's ability to represent or to be directed towards things. The sensational aspect, also called the phenomenal character of the experience, is the way that the experience subjectively feels. The phenomenal character of experiences is also sometimes referred to as qualia. In a more narrow sense, qualia are specifically the nonrepresentational aspects of phenomenal experience, which are generally thought to be an intrinsic feature of experiences.

In the philosophy of mind, some theories attempt to explain what the mind is and what all mental states have in common. One of these theories is intentionalism or representationalism. This is the view that all mental states are intentional; that is, they all have some representational content. In general, intentionalism denies the claim that there can be aspects of experiences that are purely qualitative and nonrepresentational. It attempts to explain the phenomenal feeling of experience with its representational content. It can be contrasted with qualia theories that focus on the importance of nonrepresentational qualia to explain conscious experience.

== Transparency ==
According to the transparency of experience, introspection does not reveal any features of experience, it only reveals the objects the experience is about.

The transparency of experience claims that during introspection one can only identify the properties of represented objects, not the phenomenal qualities of experience itself. Philosophers refer to this phenomenon as transparency because it suggests "we see right through" experience directly to external objects. Philosophers sometimes use specific examples to explain this idea. For example, Jaegwon Kim states:

Suppose you are looking at a ripe tomato, in good light. You have a visual experience with certain qualitative characters, or qualia—say, redness and roundness. Focus your attention on these qualia and try to determine the exact hue of the color, the precise shape you see, and so on—that is, try to closely inspect the qualities characterizing your experience. When you do this, some philosophers say, you will find yourself focusing on and examining the qualities of the tomato out there in front of you. Your visual experience of the tomato is "diaphanous," or "transparent," in that when you try to introspectively examine it, you seem to look right through it to the properties of the object seen, namely, the tomato.

Philosophers also compare experience to a painting. When looking at a painting, one can focus on what it represents. The Mona Lisa, for instance, portrays a woman with a subtle smile. It is also possible to focus on the paint itself, by looking at the shape of the brushstrokes or the specific hues used to portray light and shadow. According to the transparency of experience, it is possible to focus on what experiences represent, but one cannot focus on any "mental paint". Gilbert Harman uses the example of a painting of a unicorn. The unicorn is represented as having four legs and a horn; the painting itself has no legs or horns, and is flat and made of paint. Likewise, when one has a visual experience, Harman claims that it is important to distinguish the properties of the represented object from the properties of the experience itself. According to Harman, people cannot access any properties of experience that go beyond represented properties.

The transparency of experience is usually interpreted as involving a positive claim and a negative claim. The positive claim states that the properties of external objects can be directly attended to in experience. The negative claim states that the properties of the experience itself cannot be directly attended to. Philosophers vary on whether transparency involves just the positive claim, just the negative, or both together. Philosophers also disagree how much transparency implies about experience. Some view it as a phenomenological claim about how experiences subjectively seem. Others view it as a metaphysical claim not just about the way experiences seem, but the way they actually are. (Note: See also Gow 2016.)

Philosophers have held the transparency of experience in varying levels of strength; Amy Kind distinguishes between two views called the weak transparency thesis and the strong transparency thesis. According to the weak transparency thesis, it is difficult to introspect directly to the features of experience, but possible with close attention. The strong transparency thesis, by contrast, claims that it is impossible to directly attend to the features of experience, no matter how hard one tries. (Note: See Kind 2003.)

The transparency of experience is distinct from various other ideas also labelled transparency within the philosophy of mind and related areas. One view famously associated with René Descartes, called epistemic transparency or "the transparency of mind to itself", claims that a person cannot be wrong about their own current mental state. Another separate concept is referential transparency, the extent to which co-referring terms (like Mark Twain and Samuel Clemens, which both refer to the same person) can be substituted in sentences without altering their truth value. The idea of transparency is also applied to beliefs and self-knowledge. For example, Gareth Evans claims that considering the question about oneself "Do I believe climate change is real?" is the same as considering the question about the world "Is climate change real?", making self-knowledge transparent to the world.

== Generality and scope ==
Philosophers debate the generality and scope of the transparency of experience. Some philosophers, like Michael Tye, believe that all experiences are transparent and attempt to show how different experiences display transparency. Others restrict the transparency of experience to specific types of experience, usually perceptual experiences such as visual perception. Critics of the transparency of experience, like Ned Block, attempt to provide counterexamples to the idea. These are usually examples where there is a feeling to the experience that goes beyond its representational content. (Note: See Block 1990, 1996, 2003.)

The transparency of experience is most commonly discussed in relation to visual perception but philosophers have applied the idea to the other senses too. Clare Batty has argued that the sense of smell is transparent because smells are experienced as "out there" or "around me", not as a part of the experience itself. Tye has likewise argued that smelling, hearing and tasting are all experienced as properties of external things (odors, sounds, and tastes). According to Amy Kind, however, the cases of hearing, tasting, and touch have not been extensively discussed, and analyses of vision should not be automatically assumed to extend to other senses. (Note: The relationship between the transparency of experience and the perception of time is also contested. Ian Phillips and Matthew Soteriou have argued that the experience of time is transparent to time in the external world in the sense that one identifies one's experience as occurring at the same time as the external thing being experienced. The equivalence between this sense of transparency and the transparency of experience is controversial because it entails direct access to the temporal properties of experience; Phillips claims it is a special case of the transparency of experience. Tye argues for a more standard transparency thesis about temporal experiences, claiming that one cannot access the temporal properties of experience, only properties of continuity, change and succession in external objects.)

One problem for the transparency of experience are common-sensibles, things that can be sensed through multiple different senses. For example, it is possible to see that a coin is round and to feel its shape in one's hand. The represented feature of roundness is the same in both experiences, but it is possible to distinguish qualitatively between the sight and the touch. This is a problem for the idea of transparency because it implies that there is something accessible to experience that is not a property of represented objects, namely what sense is producing the experience. Some philosophers respond to this idea by claiming that transparency only applies within sense modalities but not between them. Others claim that there are representational differences between the senses that account for the ability to distinguish between them. (Note: A similar problem concerns the ability to distinguish between visual perception, thoughts, and visual imagination, even if they have the same representational content. Philosophers like Richard Heck claim that there are always representational differences. In particular, visual perception is far richer in detail than thoughts.)

Beyond perceptual experiences, Tye and Tim Crane have attempted to expand transparency to bodily sensations like itches and pains. According to Tye and Crane, pains represent damage located in parts of the body and one cannot focus on pain without focusing on the associated body part. Critics of transparency have pointed to the unpleasantness or painfulness of pain as a nonrepresentational part of pain experiences; one that is felt as a part of the experience, not a represented property of external things like body parts. Block also points to the example of orgasms, stating that they are "phenomenally impressive" in a way that goes beyond their representational content.

Another area where transparency is controversial is the experience of emotions and moods. These experiences seem neither to have any representational content nor to be located anywhere in the external world. Nonetheless, Tye has attempted to expand transparency to these experiences. For example, emotions of jealousy, anger or joy are often felt in the body, such as in a sinking of the stomach or heightened heartbeat. Likewise, he claims that more general moods, like depression or anxiety, represent the entire world in a particular light, perhaps as dangerous or pointless. Critics claim that if moods and emotions do have representational content, it is still only a minor part of the whole feeling of the experience.

A counterexample appealed to within visual perception is blurred vision. It is used as a counterexample to transparency because blurriness seems to be a property of the experience itself, not the way things are represented. For example, blurred vision of a tree does not represent the tree itself as having the property of blurriness. Proponents of transparency argue that blurred vision is still fully representational, just at a lower resolution, although some critics claim this simply misses the point that blurriness is presented as a property of experience, not a property of represented objects. Other proposed counterexamples include double vision, phosphene images, and afterimages. (Note: Some philosophers also argue that all ordinary experiences are transparent but that some special introspective viewpoints can reveal the existence of qualia or higher-order what-it-is-like properties. See, for example, Loar 2003.)

== The transparency argument ==
The transparency of experience has been used to argue for intentionalism and against qualia theories. Its use in this way is often referred to as the argument from transparency or the argument from diaphanousness. There are a number of different ways to interpret this argument. One way is to view it as an inference to the best explanation. According to this approach, transparency claims that experience presents represented properties of objects, and the best explanation for this is that experience is fundamentally representational (intentionalism).

Furthermore, transparency claims that introspection does not reveal any phenomenal qualities of experience itself, which is best explained by the idea that there are no such qualities; or, in other words, there are no qualia. This is closely related to an interpretation that transparency simply contradicts the existence of qualia. According to this line of argument, if qualia exist then they are necessarily accessible to introspection. But transparency states that there are no qualia accessible to introspection. The argument concludes that qualia cannot possibly exist.

Another way of interpreting the argument is as an argument that experience cannot be fundamentally misleading. If experience seems to be transparent in that it presents the properties of represented objects and not experience itself, then this view of experience should be accepted as reliable. According to Tye, to support other views over intentionalism would be to claim that experience is systematically misleading and this is "totally implausible".

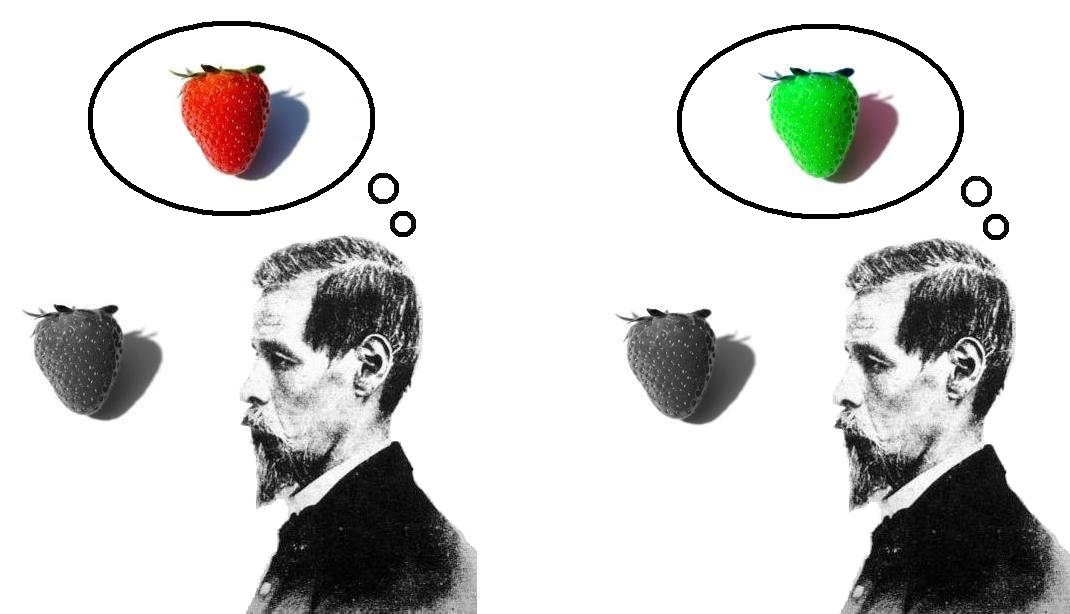
An illustration of the inverted spectrum thought experiment

There are a number of arguments against the transparency argument. The most common response is to point to counterexamples such as bodily sensations, moods, and visual experiences like blurred vision. Some critics of the argument claim that it relies on the strong transparency thesis and argue that only a weaker transparency thesis is true. Another counterargument claims that the transparency argument relies on introspection to draw highly theoretical conclusions, but introspection is not reliable enough to support highly theoretical claims.

Another approach is to use thought experiments to show that intentionality cannot account for the phenomenal character of experience. The thought experiment most commonly appealed to is the inverted spectrum. This is the idea that two people could see the same colour but have different conscious experiences of it; both could call an apple "red" but each would have an inverted colour experience compared to the other. In this case, both people represent the apple as red even though the phenomenal character of their experiences is different. (Note: See also Block 1990.)

=== Other interpretations ===
There are views other than intentionalism that are also compatible with the transparency of experience. One is naïve realism. This is the view that perception is a form of direct acquaintance with external objects; the properties presented in experience are not qualia or representations, but the actual properties of things being perceived. In this way, perception is like a fully transparent window to external objects. Supporters of the transparency argument for intentionalism, like Tye, generally argue that naïve realism cannot be true because it cannot account for hallucinations, where there are no real external objects or properties. A similar view to naïve realism is disjunctivism, which claims that perceptual experiences are either direct awareness of external objects or hallucinations, which are two fundamentally different types of mental state. Philosophers such as M. G. F. Martin have used transparency to argue for this view instead of intentionalism. (Note: See Martin 2002.)

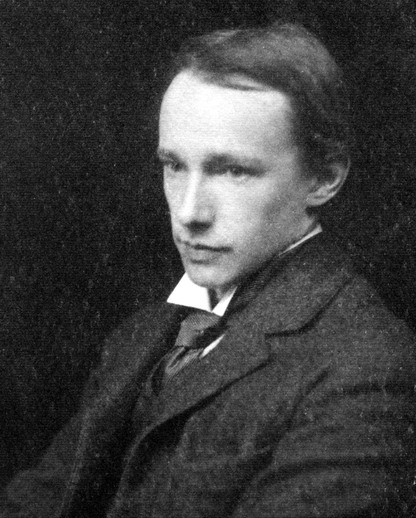
G. E. Moore argued that experience only seems transparent, but that it "can be distinguished if we look attentively enough".

According to G. E. Moore, the appearance that experience is transparent or "diaphanous" is a reason behind the appeal of idealism. This is because the transparency of experience makes it difficult to distinguish between experience and the objects it represents, leading to the conclusion that they are one and the same. Moore himself was an opponent of idealism and believed that experience was only weakly transparent because the properties of conscious experience "can be distinguished if we look attentively enough". (Note: See Moore 1903.) Moore himself was a defender of sense data, mental objects that are the direct objects of perception. Unlike intentionalism, this is a view that can be supported by a weak transparency thesis.

The transparency of experience has also been used to argue for a view called phenomenal intentionality theory. (Note: See Horgan & Tienson 2002; Loar 2003; Frey 2013.) Phenomenal intentionality theory explains intentionality in terms of phenomenal consciousness. This is the reverse of the position taken by intentionalism, which explains phenomenal character in terms of intentionality. The transparency of experience is generally thought to support the idea that phenomenal character and intentionality are deeply linked because it shows that phenomenal character cannot be separated out from intentionality in the form of qualia. Supporters of phenomenal intentionality make the further claim that the transparency of experience reveals that the intentionality of experience is due to its phenomenal character.

== Transparency and introspection ==
One way of characterising the transparency of experience is as the idea that attention or awareness cannot be inward-directed. A question raised by this characterisation is how the transparency of experience can explain introspective awareness of inner experience. A common response to this question draws a distinction between direct and indirect forms of awareness. This approach says that it is not possible to be directly aware of inner experiences, but one can be aware of them indirectly. For example, Fred Dretske has likened introspection to displaced perception, such as when one becomes aware that a car is out of fuel by looking at its fuel gauge. In this case, the fuel gauge is the subject of direct awareness and this gives an indirect awareness of the level of fuel in the car. According to this approach to transparency, it is possible to be indirectly aware that one is having an experience of a tree, but only by being directly aware of the tree.

Philosophers have cited various pieces of evidence to support either the transparency view or inward-directed attention. Assaf Weksler, Hilla Jacobson and Zohar Z. Bronfman have argued that inward-directed attention is incompatible with empirical results and categories of attention used within cognitive psychology. Other philosophers, such as Thomas Metzinger, Victor Lange, and Thor Grünbaum argue from clinical research that practicing mindfulness can allow inward-directed attention, hence contradicting transparency. Ned Block has argued that studies on attention and visual appearance suggest that appearances can vary independently of the object of external attention, showing that attention can be inward-directed.

Another argument concerns the idea that transparency assumes a perceptual model of introspection. Within perception, attention can only be turned to one thing by turning it away from another. Likewise, some critics have argued that the transparency of experience assumes that to turn attention towards inner experience means that it must be turned away from external objects. Critics of the transparency of experience have rejected such a view, arguing that it is possible to attend directly to external objects and inner experience at the same time. For example, some philosophers argue that perceptual attention and introspective attention are separate forms of attention that can occur simultaneously.

== History ==
The transparency of experience can be traced back to the early modern period in the writings of the common sense philosopher Thomas Reid. Reid claimed that "our attention is commonly employed about that which is the object of our thought, and rarely about the thought itself" and said sensations like the feeling of hardness are "never attended to, but [pass] through the mind instantaneously".

Transparency was a topic discussed in Austrian and German philosophy towards the end of the 19th century, where it was used to argue against Franz Brentano's distinction between a mental act and its objects. For example, Paul Natorp said of hearing "I cannot consider myself and my hearing in isolation without thinking of the tone. Rather, when I try to do so I find that nothing remains that can be considered, investigated or about which a statement can be made." Similar viewpoints were taken by Friedrich Albert Lange and Hermann Ulrici, as well as Alexius Meinong who called the idea Wahrnehmungsflüchtigkeit, or perceptual elusiveness. Edmund Husserl was critical of this idea, using experiences of perceptual constancy as a counterexample.

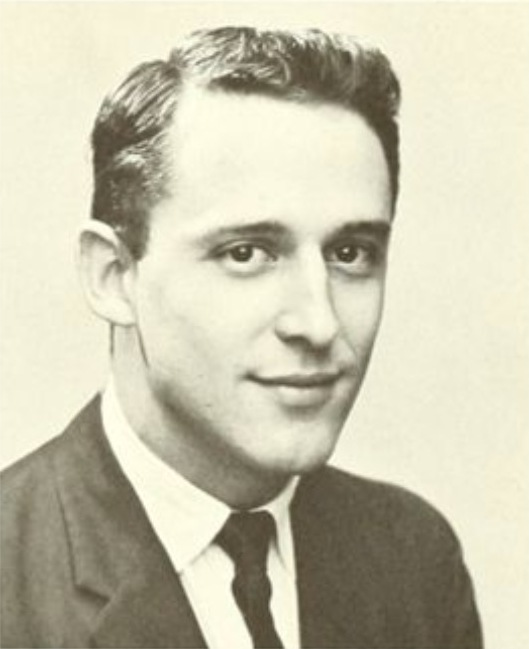
Gilbert Harman introduced the transparency argument to contemporary philosophy.

The idea became more prominent at the start of the 20th century due to a passage in G. E. Moore's 1903 paper "The Refutation of Idealism". Arguing against idealism, Moore called conscious experience "diaphanous" and claimed that "that which makes the sensation of blue a mental fact seems to escape us: it seems, if I may use a metaphor, to be transparent—we look through it and see nothing but the blue". Moore's statements about transparency were influential on philosophers like William James and B. A. Farrell, who used the transparency of experience to challenge the idea that experiences are inner objects that can be examined through introspection. (Note: See James 1904 and Farrell 1950. In contrast to these views, C. D. Broad (1925) argued for a distinction between inspection and introspection to defend the existence of conscious experiences from transparency-based objections.)

In contemporary philosophy, the transparency of experience has become more associated with arguments for intentionalism. A prominent example is due to Gilbert Harman, who introduced the transparency argument for intentionalism in his 1990 paper "The Intrinsic Quality of Experience". Harman distinguished between the properties of objects and the properties of experience. Using the thought experiment of a woman named Eloise looking at a tree, he claimed "the colors [Eloise] experiences are all experienced as features of the tree ... None of them are experienced as intrinsic features of her experience." (Note: See Harman 1990.) The transparency argument is also associated with Michael Tye, who has used the transparency of experience to support intentionalism across a number of works since the 1990s. (Note: See, for example, Tye 1995, 2000, 2014.) A similar view was taken by Jean-Paul Sartre, who denied non-intentional aspects of experience and the existence of a transcendental ego due to the transparency or "emptiness" of experience. (Note: See Sartre's The Transcendence of the Ego (1936).)
