= James Lenman =

British philosopher

James W. Lenman
- Awards: Sir Henry Jones Memorial Prize; Grants from Arts and Humanities Research Board Research Leave Scheme; Leverhulme Trust Major Research Fellowship

Education
- Education: High School of Dundee
- Alma mater: University of St Andrews (MPhil, PhD); University of Oxford (BA)
- Thesis: Realism and Idealism in the Theory of Value (1995)
- Doctoral advisor: John Haldane

Philosophical work
- Era: 21st-century philosophy
- Region: Western philosophy
- School: Analytic
- Institutions: University of Sheffield
- Main interests: ethics
- Notable ideas: arguments against consequentialism, constructive expressivism
- Website: https://www.jimmylenman.com/

James W. Lenman is a British philosopher and Professor of Philosophy at the University of Sheffield. He is known for his expertise on ethics. Lenman is a former president of the British Society for Ethical Theory (2002-2008).

James Lenman has published work on metaethics, where he defends a form of constructive expressivism, contractualism, and moral responsibility, among others. He is a critic of consequentialism.

== Books ==
- Constructivism in Practical Philosophy, edited by James Lenman and Yonatan Shemmer, Oxford University Press, 2012
- The Possibility of Moral Community, Oxford University Press, 2024
- Should We Maximize Utility, with Ben Bramble, Routledge, 2025

== See also ==
- Free will illusionism
