= Self-Constitution =

2009 book by Christine Korsgaard

- Author: Christine Korsgaard
- Cover artist: Thomas Cole, Expulsion titi the Garden of Eden - 1828
- Language: English
- Genre: Philosophy
- Publisher: Oxford University Press
- Publication date: 2009
- Publication place: Great Britain
- Pages: 230
- ISBN: 978-0-19-955280-1

Self-Constitution: Agency, Identity, and Integrity is a philosophical book by Christine Korsgaard, in which the author sets out to demonstrate how people determine their own actions. A dialogue with Kant, Aristotle, and Plato takes place throughout the book.

== See also ==
- Ethics
- Immanuel Kant
- Autonomy
- Self-concept

== Reviews ==
- Review in Dialogue (June 2010) by Jasper Doomen
- Review in Analysis (July 2010) by Michael Ridge and Ana Barandalla
- Review in The Philosophical Quarterly (January 2011) by Markus Schlosser
- Review in Ethics (January 2011) by Sergio Tenenbaum
