= Psychological determinism =

Concept in psychology

Psychological determinism is the view that psychological phenomena are determined by factors outside of a person's control.

Dr. Daniel Bader discusses two forms of psychological determinism:

- Orectic psychological determinism is the view that we always act upon our greatest drive. This is often called psychological hedonism, and if the drive is specified for self-interest, psychological egoism.
- Rational psychological determinism claims that we always act according to our "strongest" or "best" reason.

== See also ==
- Free will
- Determinism
- Moral nihilism
- Moral skepticism
