= Moral constructivism =

Philosophical position

Moral constructivism or ethical constructivism is a view both in meta-ethics and normative ethics which posits that:

1. Ethical sentences express propositions.
2. Some such propositions are true.
3. The truth or falsity of such propositions is ineliminably dependent on the result of a suitable constructivist procedure.

Metaethical constructivism holds that correctness of moral judgments, principles and values is determined by being the result of a suitable constructivist procedure. In other words, normative values are a construction of human practical reason. It is opposed to standard forms of moral realism, which posit that morality holds or exists objectively (i.e. stance independently), non-cognitivism, which denies that morality can be constructed rationally, and error theory, which denies the possibility of constructing an objective truth.

In normative ethics, moral constructivism is the view that principles and values within a given normative domain can be justified based on the very fact that they are the result of a suitable constructivist device or procedure.

== See also ==
- Constructivism in Practical Philosophy
- Ethical subjectivism
- Practical reason
- Pragmatic ethics
