= Elizabeth Harman (philosopher) =

American philosopher

Education
- Education: Harvard University (A.B.); Massachusetts Institute of Technology (Ph.D.)
- Thesis: Moral Status (2003)
- Doctoral advisor: Joshua Cohen

Philosophical work
- Era: 21st-century philosophy
- Region: Western philosophy
- School: Analytic philosophy
- Institutions: Princeton University
- Main interests: Ethics, metaphysics
- Website: http://www.princeton.edu/~eharman/

Elizabeth Harman is an American philosopher and Laurance S. Rockefeller Professor of Philosophy at Princeton University.

== Biography ==
Harman's father is Gilbert Harman, professor of philosophy. Harman's mother was Lucy Harman, a psychotherapist at Princeton University.

As a professor of philosophy, Harman is known for her expertise on ethics, specifically on ethics of abortion.

Harman's husband, Alex Guerrero, is Henry Rutgers Term Chair and Associate Professor of Philosophy at Rutgers University.
