= Gilbert Harman =

American philosopher (1938–2021)

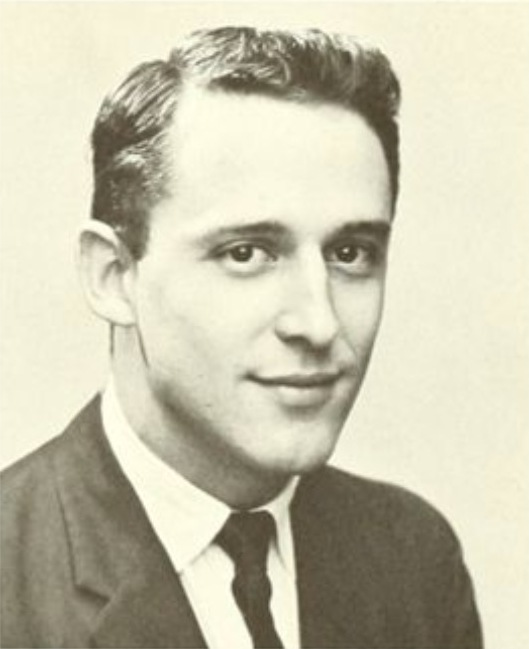
- Harman as a student in 1960
- Born: May 26, 1938; East Orange, New Jersey, U.S.
- Died: November 13, 2021 (aged 83); Princeton, New Jersey, U.S.

Education
- Education: Swarthmore College (BA); Harvard University (PhD)
- Doctoral advisor: Willard Van Orman Quine

Philosophical work
- Era: Contemporary philosophy
- Region: Western philosophy
- School: Analytic philosophy
- Institutions: Princeton University
- Doctoral students: James Dreier, Joshua Knobe, Graham Oppy, Daniel Rothschild, Stephen Stich
- Main interests: Philosophy of language, philosophy of mind, ethics, epistemology
- Notable ideas: Intentionalism about perceptual experience Three levels of meaning Situationist critique of virtue ethics Transparency of experience Brain in a vat thought experiment

Gilbert Harman (May 26, 1938 – November 13, 2021) was an American philosopher, who taught at Princeton University from 1963 until his retirement in 2017. He published widely in philosophy of language, cognitive science, philosophy of mind, ethics, moral psychology, epistemology, statistical learning theory, and metaphysics.

He and George Miller co-directed the Princeton University Cognitive Science Laboratory. Harman taught or co-taught courses in electrical engineering, computer science, psychology, philosophy, and linguistics.

== Education and career ==
Harman had a BA from Swarthmore College and a Ph.D. from Harvard University, where he was supervised by Willard Van Orman Quine. He taught at Princeton from 1963 until his retirement in 2017 as the James S. McDonnell Distinguished University Professor in Philosophy. He was named a Fellow of the Cognitive Science Society and a Fellow of the Association for Psychological Science. He was also a Fellow of the American Academy of Arts & Sciences. He received the Jean Nicod Prize in Paris in 2005. In 2009 he received Princeton University's Behrman award for distinguished achievement in the humanities. His acceptance speech was titled "We need a linguistics department."

Some of his well-known PhD students include Graham Oppy, Stephen Stich, Joshua Greene, Joshua Knobe, David Wong, Richard Joyce, R. Jay Wallace, James Dreier, and Nicholas L. Sturgeon.

== Personal life ==
His daughter Elizabeth Harman is also a philosopher and a member of the philosophy department and the Center for Human Values at Princeton University.

== Epistemology ==
Harman's 1965 account of the role of "inference to the best explanation"—inferring the existence of that which we need for the best explanation of observable phenomena—has been very influential. In later work, he argued that all inference or reasoning should be conceived as rational "change in view," balancing conservatism against coherence, where simplicity and explanatory considerations are relevant to positive coherence and where avoiding inconsistency is relevant to negative coherence. He expressed doubts about appeals to a priori knowledge and argued that logic and decision theory are theories of implication and consistency and should not be interpreted as theories that can be followed: they are not theories of inference or reasoning.

Harman formulated the no false lemmas principle as a proposed method of solving Gettier problems.

In Thought and Change in View Harman argued that intuitions about knowledge are useful in thinking about inference. More recently, he and Brett Sherman have suggested that knowledge can rest on assumptions that are not themselves known. He and Sanjeev Kulkarni have suggested that elementary statistical learning theory offers a kind of response to the philosophical problem of induction.

== Mind ==
Harman also argued that perceptual experience has "intentional content" and that it is important not to confuse qualities of the intentional object of experience with qualities of the experience. Perceivers are only aware of qualities that are presented to them in experience, as opposed to properties of experience that represent what we experience as a kind of mental paint. This idea is called the transparency of experience.

He also proposed that perceptual and other psychological states are self-reflective so that the content of a perceptual experience might be: this very experience is the result of perceiving a tree with such and such features (except that the experience is not in language). The content of an intention might be: this very intention will lead me to go home by six o'clock.

== Ethics ==
In The Nature of Morality, Harman, relying on inference to the best explanation, argued that there are no objective moral facts because we do not need such facts to explain our moral judgments. He argued that there is not a single true morality. In that respect, moral relativism is true. (This sort of moral relativism is not a theory about what ordinary people mean by their moral judgments.)

Harman rejected attempts to base moral theory on conceptions of human flourishing and character traits and expressed skepticism about the need for a good person to be susceptible to moral guilt or shame.

== Works ==
Monographs:

- Thought (Princeton, 1973) ISBN 0-691-07188-8
- The Nature of Morality: An Introduction to Ethics (Oxford, 1977) ISBN 0-19-502143-6
- Change in View: Principles of Reasoning (MIT, 1986) ISBN 0-262-58091-8
- Scepticism and the Definition of Knowledge (Garland, 1990) [This is Gilbert Harman's doctoral dissertation which was submitted to Harvard University in 1964]
- (with Judith Jarvis Thomson), Moral Relativism and Moral Objectivity (Blackwell, 1996) ISBN 0-631-19211-5
- Reasoning, Meaning and Mind (Clarendon, 1999) ISBN 0-19-823802-9
- Explaining Value and Other Essays in Moral Philosophy (Clarendon, 2000) ISBN 0-19-823804-5
- (with Sanjeev Kulkarni) Reliable Reasoning: Induction and Statistical Learning Theory (MIT Press, 2007)
- (with Sanjeev Kulkarni) An Elementary Introduction to Statistical Learning Theory (Wiley, 2012).

Edited:

- (with Donald Davidson), Semantics of Natural Language (D. Reidel, 1972)
- On Noam Chomsky: Critical Essays (Anchor, 1974)
- (with Donald Davidson), The Logic of Grammar (Dickenson, 1975)
- Conceptions of the Human Mind: Essays in Honor of George A. Miller (Laurence Erlbaum, 1993)
- (with Ernie Lepore), A Companion to W.V.O. Quine (Wiley, 2014)

== See also ==
- American philosophy
- List of Jean Nicod Prize laureates
- Moral skepticism
- List of American philosophers
