= Elizabeth M. Harman =

American firefighter (born 1973)

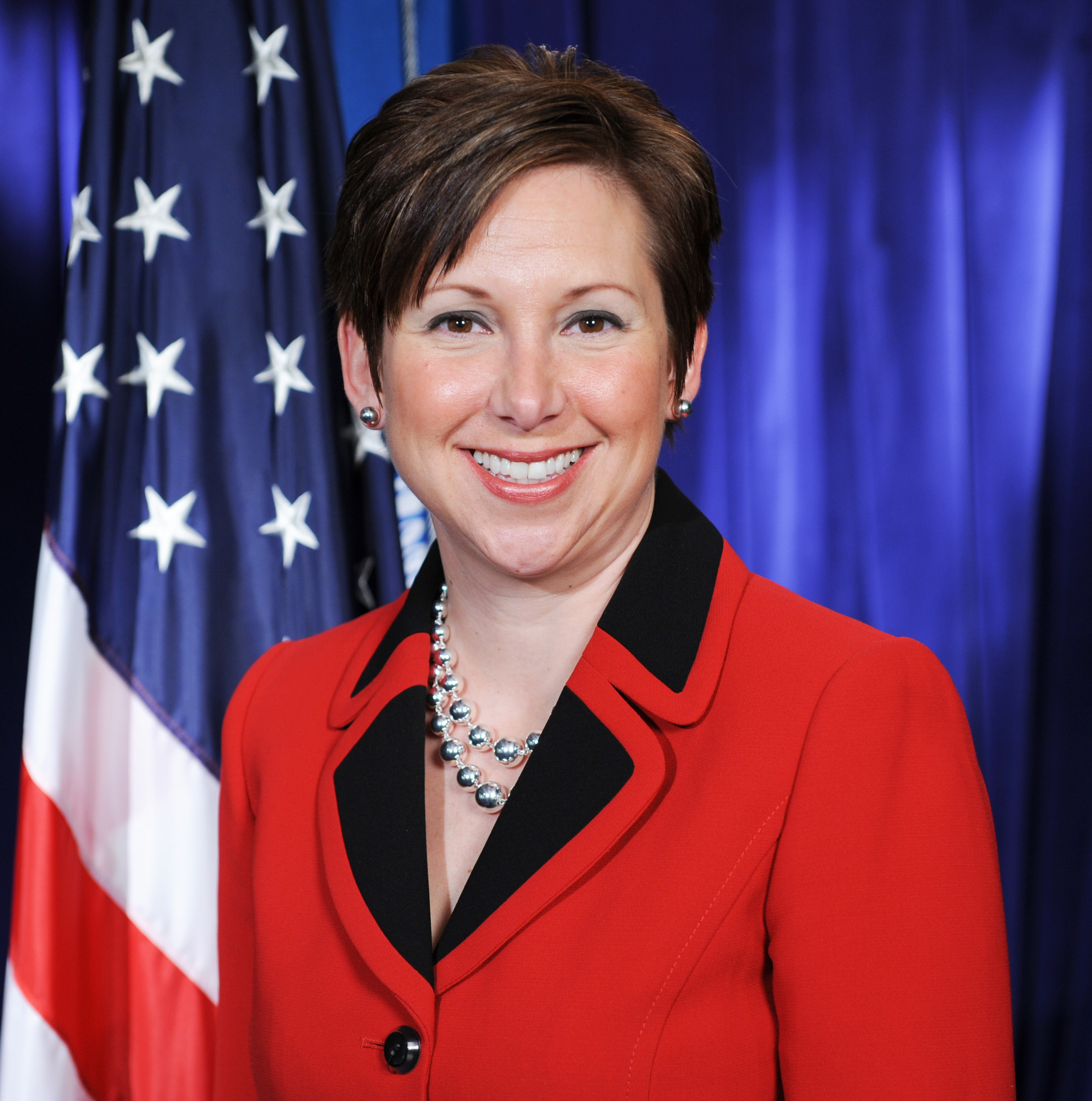
Harman in March 2010

Elizabeth M. Harman (born April 23, 1973) is general president of the International Association of Fire Fighters (IAFF) in Washington, D.C. Prior to this, beginning in 2013, she served as its assistant to the general president for grants administration and HazMat/WMD Training Division.

== Early life and education ==
Harman received an MBA from California Pacific University, and a master's degree in Emergency Health Services from the University of Maryland, College Park.

== Career ==
Harman is a former firefighter in Fairfax, Virginia, and director of the Hazardous Materials and Weapons of Mass Destruction Training Department at the International Association of Fire Fighters.

During her service at the Maryland Emergency Management Agency (MEMA) as state administrator for exercise and training for the National Capital Region, she worked with various local, state, federal, and private sector partners to evaluate the effectiveness of response to both small- and large-scale disasters. Harman helped coordinate disaster declarations under the Stafford Act; she counseled counties on assistance that was available. Harman helped coordinate EMAC National Coordinating Team (NCT) requests to provide aid to affected areas. She led Maryland's NIMS rollout efforts and during Hurricane Katrina and Hurricane Rita, Harman served as the state liaison under the incident management system and coordinated efforts to receive evacuees.

In May 2009, Harman testified before the House Subcommittee on Railroads, Pipelines and Hazardous Materials on Reauthorization of the Department of Transportation’s Hazardous Materials Safety Program on how to best improve our nation’s hazardous materials response capabilities and keep first responders safe.

In March 2010, she was appointed assistant administrator for the Department of Homeland Security (DHS), Federal Emergency Management Agency's Grant Programs Directorate (GPD).

Harman has served as a faculty member for several universities, including the Johns Hopkins School of Medicine, the Fire and Rescue Institute at the University of Maryland, College Park, George Washington University, and Northwestern State University.
