= James Dreier =

American philosopher (born 1960)

- Born: 1960 (age 65–66)

Education
- Education: Princeton University (PhD)
- Doctoral advisor: Gilbert Harman

Philosophical work
- Era: Contemporary philosophy
- Region: Western philosophy
- Institutions: Brown University
- Main interests: Metaethics, moral philosophy
- Notable ideas: Metametaethics

James Dreier (born 1960), also known as Jamie Dreier, is an American philosopher and Judy C. Lewent and Mark L. Shapiro Professor of Philosophy at Brown University. He is known for his work in metaethics, especially on the subjects of expressivism and metametaethics. Dreier is an associate editor of Ethics.

== Books ==
- James Dreier (ed.), Contemporary Debates in Moral Theory, Blackwell, 2006, 331pp., ISBN 1405101792.
