= Sanjeev Kulkarni =

Indian-born American academic (born 1963)

Sanjeev Ramesh Kulkarni (born September 21, 1963 in Mumbai, India) is an Indian-born American academic. He is the William R. Kenan, Jr., Professor of Electrical and Computer Engineering and Operation Research and Financial Engineering at Princeton University, where he teaches and conducts research in a broad range of areas including statistical inference, pattern recognition, machine learning, information theory, and signal/image processing. He is also affiliated with the Department of Philosophy. His work in philosophy is joint with Gilbert Harman. Kulkarni served as Associate Dean for Princeton University School of Engineering and Applied Science from 2003–2005, Master of Butler College from 2004-2012, Director of the Keller Center for Innovation in Engineering Education from 2011-2014,Dean of the Graduate School from 2014-2017, and Dean of the Faculty from 2017-2021 at Princeton University.

== Education ==
Kulkarni received degrees in mathematics and electrical engineering from Clarkson University, an M.S. in Electrical Engineering from Stanford University in 1985, and the Ph.D. degree in Electrical Engineering from Massachusetts Institute of Technology in 1991.
