= Richard Joyce (philosopher) =

British-New Zealand moral philosopher

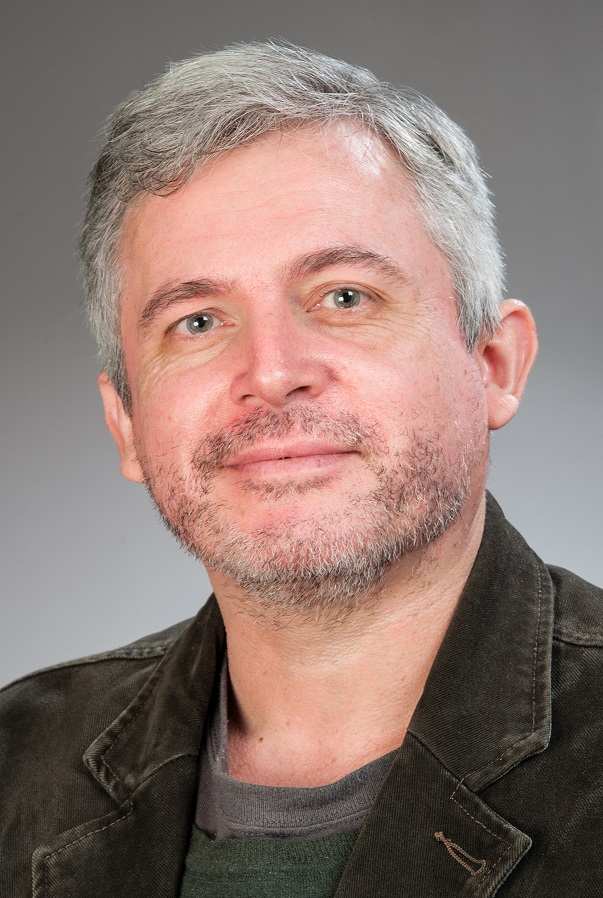
- Born: 1966 (age 59–60)

Education
- Education: University of Auckland (BA, 1989; MA, 1991); Princeton University (PhD, 1998)

Philosophical work
- Era: Contemporary philosophy
- Region: Western philosophy
- School: Analytic
- Main interests: Meta-ethics; Moral psychology

Richard Joyce (born 1966) is a British-Australian-New Zealand philosopher, known for his contributions to the fields of meta-ethics and moral psychology. Joyce was born in England and raised in New Zealand. He received his PhD from Princeton University in 1998 (studying under Gilbert Harman). He has held positions at the University of Sheffield, the Australian National University, and the University of Sydney. Since 2010 he has been a Professor of Philosophy at Victoria University of Wellington.

== Ideas ==
=== Moral error theory ===
To hold an error theory about morality is to endorse a kind of radical moral skepticism—a skepticism analogous to atheism in the religious domain. The atheist thinks that religious utterances, such as "God loves you," really are truth-evaluable assertions (as opposed to being veiled commands or expressions of hope, etc.), but that the world just doesn't contain the items (e.g., God) necessary to render such assertions true. Similarly, the moral error theorist maintains that moral judgments are truth-evaluable assertions (thus contrasting with noncognitivism) but that the world doesn't contain the properties (e.g., moral goodness, evil, moral obligation) needed to render moral judgments true. In other words, moral discourse aims at the truth but systematically fails to secure it. This view was argued for by J.L. Mackie in his 1977 book, and Mackie's position and arguments have been developed by Joyce in many publications, most notably his 2001 book The Myth of Morality.

=== Moral fictionalism ===
If a moral error theory is true, then what are we supposed to do with our faulty moral discourse? The natural thought is that we should more or less do away with it (abolitionism). Another possibility is that we should carry on believing it, even while maintaining that it is false (conservationism). Joyce, in contrast, defends a third way—the fictionalist view—which treats morality as a kind of convenient fiction. According to the moral fictionalist, we should carry on using moral discourse, though not believing it or asserting it, such that it has a status similar to make-believe. Joyce likens this view to our familiar use of metaphors, whereby we can convey something important and true via saying something false.

=== Moral nativism ===
Where does the human capacity for moral thinking come from? One view is that it is the by-product of other psychological faculties that evolved for other purposes—perhaps a relatively recent cultural phenomenon that emerged when humans started living in large groups. Joyce has explored and tentatively advocated the alternative nativist view, according to which human moral thinking is a distinct biological adaptation (i.e., that we are "hard-wired" for moral thinking). Joyce hypothesizes that moral thinking evolved in order to strengthen our ancestors' motivation to engage in adaptive cooperative behavior. This is the subject of his 2006 book The Evolution of Morality.

=== Evolutionary debunking argument ===
If human moral thinking evolved in order to strengthen cooperative bonds among our ancestors, then the question arises as to why we should suppose that it provides us with accurate information. Why should we trust our moral intuitions, no matter how strong they are, if we have a reasonable explanation of their origin that is compatible with their being entirely false? Joyce has developed and defended what has come to be known as an "evolutionary debunking argument," according to which the evolutionary origin of human moral thinking might give us cause to doubt our moral judgments. The conclusion of Joyce's debunking argument is not the error-theoretic view that all moral judgments are false (though this is a conclusion he argues for elsewhere), but the epistemological view that all moral judgments are unjustified.

== Works ==
Joyce is the author of several books:

- Morality: From Error to Fiction (OUP, 2024).
- Essays in Moral Skepticism (OUP, 2016).
- The Evolution of Morality (MIT Press, 2006).
- The Myth of Morality (CUP, 2001).

He is editor (or co-editor) of several collections:

- Moral Fictionalism and Religious Fictionalism (with Stuart Brock) (OUP, 2023).
- The End of Morality (with Richard Garner) (Routledge, 2019).
- The Routledge Handbook of Evolution and Philosophy (Routledge, 2017).
- Cooperation and its Evolution (with Kim Sterelny, Brett Calcott, and Ben Fraser) (MIT Press, 2013).
- A World Without Values: Essays on John Mackie’s Moral Error Theory (with Simon Kirchin) (Springer 2010).

Joyce has also published numerous journal articles and book chapters.
