= Michael A. Smith (philosopher) =

Australian philosopher

- Born: Michael Andrew Smith; 23 July 1954 (age 71); Melbourne, Australia
- Awards: Centenary Medal, APA book prize, AAA&S Fellow

Education
- Education: Monash University (BA, MA); University of Oxford (BPhil, DPhil)
- Thesis: Motivation and Moral Realism (1989)
- Doctoral advisor: Simon Blackburn

Philosophical work
- Era: Contemporary philosophy
- Region: Western philosophy
- School: Analytic philosophy
- Institutions: Princeton University
- Main interests: Moral philosophy, philosophy of mind, philosophy of language, political philosophy, moral psychology

Michael Andrew Smith (born 23 July 1954) is an Australian philosopher who teaches at Princeton University (since September 2004). He taught previously at the University of Oxford, Monash University, and was a member of the Philosophy Program at the Research School of Social Sciences, Australian National University. He is the author of a number of important books and articles in moral philosophy.

== Education and career ==
Smith earned his B.A. and M.A. in philosophy at Monash University, while his BPhil and DPhil were acquired at Oxford University under the direction of Simon Blackburn. He has held teaching appointments at various universities, including Wadham College, Oxford (1984), Monash (1984–5; 1989–94), Princeton (1985–89; 2004–present), and the Research School of Social Sciences at the Australian National University (1995–2004).

In 2000, Smith's book The Moral Problem (1994) received The American Philosophical Association's first APA Book Prize for excellence in scholarship. Smith is considered to be one of the most important philosophers working in meta-ethics, and is one of the main proponents of a Neo-Humean approach to practical reason.

== Philosophical work ==
=== The moral problem ===
In The Moral Problem Smith diagnoses a longstanding tension between the apparent objectivity and practicality of moral judgments. The idea of moral objectivity is that "it is a distinctive feature of engaging in moral practice that the participants are concerned to get the answers to moral questions right." (1994 p. 5) Moral judgments are thought to be practical because they are thought to motivate those who accept them. But according to the Humean theory of motivation, a theory that Smith defends in chapter 4, it is not possible for a belief (a judgement about a matter of fact) to motivate someone without the presence of some antecedently held desire. Thus, if moral judgments are beliefs that motivate, they can only be beliefs about how to get something that we already want. But moral judgments, such as the judgment that murder is wrong, are not judgments about how to get something that we already want. Therefore, either they are not beliefs at all (and are therefore not objective) or they cannot motivate us (and are therefore not practical).

=== Neo-Humeanism ===
Hume famously claimed that reason is, and ought to be, only the slave of the passions. Humeans or Neo-Humeans do not typically hold strictly to Hume's views because, for one thing, they do not think of the passions in the same way that Hume did. Nonetheless, Humeans take their inspiration from Hume in claiming that reason alone is insufficient to motivate us to act. Often this claim is expressed in terms of beliefs and desires, and it is claimed that beliefs are mental states that are insufficient for motivation. Smith gives an analysis of action whereby in order for anything to count as an action at all, it must be explicable in terms of a belief-desire pair. He defends this account against objections by appeal to a dispositional conception of desire.

=== Moral realism ===
In later work, Smith gives an anti-Humean account of normative reasons. He thus claims to solve the moral problem by giving an account of moral judgments in terms of what one would desire if one were fully rational. As such, he attempts to maintain a form of moral realism while still accounting for the motivational force of moral judgments.

== Honours and recognition ==
Smith was elected a Corresponding Fellow of the Australian Academy of the Humanities in 1997 and a Fellow of the American Academy of Arts and Sciences in 2013.

== Selection publications ==
=== Books ===
- (1994) The Moral Problem (Wiley-Blackwell).
- (2004) Ethics and the A Priori: Selected Essays on Moral Psychology and Meta-Ethics (Cambridge University Press)
- (2004) Mind, Morality, and Explanation: Selected Collaborations (with Frank Jackson and Philip Pettit) (Oxford University Press)

=== Articles ===
- "The Humean Theory of Motivation" (1987), Mind, Vol. 96, No. 381, (Jan.) pp. 36–61. JSTOR
