= Garrett Cullity =

Australian philosopher

- Awards: Eureka Prize

Education
- Education: Oxford University (PhD), University of Western Australia (BA)
- Thesis: The moral demands of affluence (1991)

Philosophical work
- Era: 21st-century philosophy
- Region: Western philosophy
- School: Analytic
- Institutions: Australian National University (2020-); University of Adelaide (2007-2020)
- Main interests: moral philosophy
- Website: http://www.garrettcullity.com/

Garrett Michael Cullity is an Australian philosopher and Professor of Philosophy at Australian National University. He was Hughes Professor of Philosophy at the University of Adelaide between 2007 and 2020. He is known for his research on moral philosophy. Cullity is a Fellow of Australian Academy of the Social Sciences and Australian Academy of the Humanities, and a former president of Australasian Association of Philosophy (2012-2013).

== Books ==
- Concern, Respect, and Cooperation, Oxford University Press, 2018
- The Moral Demands of Affluence, Oxford University Press, 2004
- Ethics and Practical Reason, co-edited with Berys Gaut, Oxford University Press, 1997

== See also ==
- Demandingness objection
- Practical reason
