= Christine Korsgaard =

American philosopher in Left-Kantian tradition

Christine Korsgaard FBA
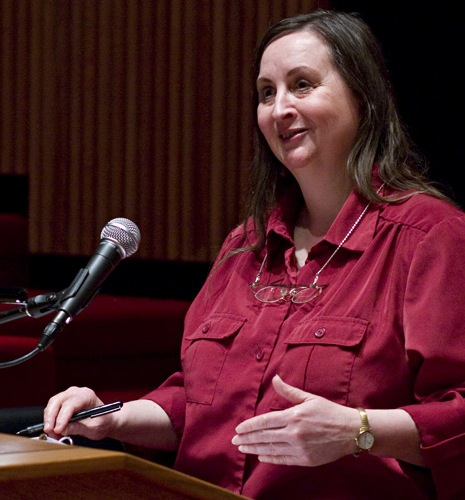
- Korsgaard in 2010
- Born: Christine Marion Korsgaard; April 9, 1952 (age 74); Chicago, Illinois, U.S.

Academic background
- Education: Harvard University; University of Illinois
- Thesis: The Standpoint of Practical Reason (1981)
- Doctoral advisor: Martha Nussbaum, John Rawls
- Other advisors: Hilary Putnam, Amélie Rorty

Academic work
- Era: Contemporary philosophy
- Region: Western philosophy
- School or tradition: Analytic
- Institutions: Harvard University
- Main interests: Moral philosophy · Kantianism
- Notable ideas: Normativity grounded in the self-constitution of the agent

Christine Marion Korsgaard (/ˈkɔːrzɡɑːrd/; born April 9, 1952) is an American philosopher who is the Arthur Kingsley Porter Professor of Philosophy Emerita at Harvard University. Her main scholarly interests are in moral philosophy and its history; the relation of issues in moral philosophy to issues in metaphysics, the philosophy of mind, and the theory of personal identity; the theory of personal relationships; and in normativity in general.

== Education and career ==
Korsgaard first attended Eastern Illinois University for two years and transferred to receive a B.A. from the University of Illinois and a Ph.D from Harvard, where she was a student of John Rawls. She was awarded an honorary LHD Doctor of Humane Letters from the University of Illinois in 2004. She is a 1970 alumna of Homewood-Flossmoor High School in Flossmoor, Ill.

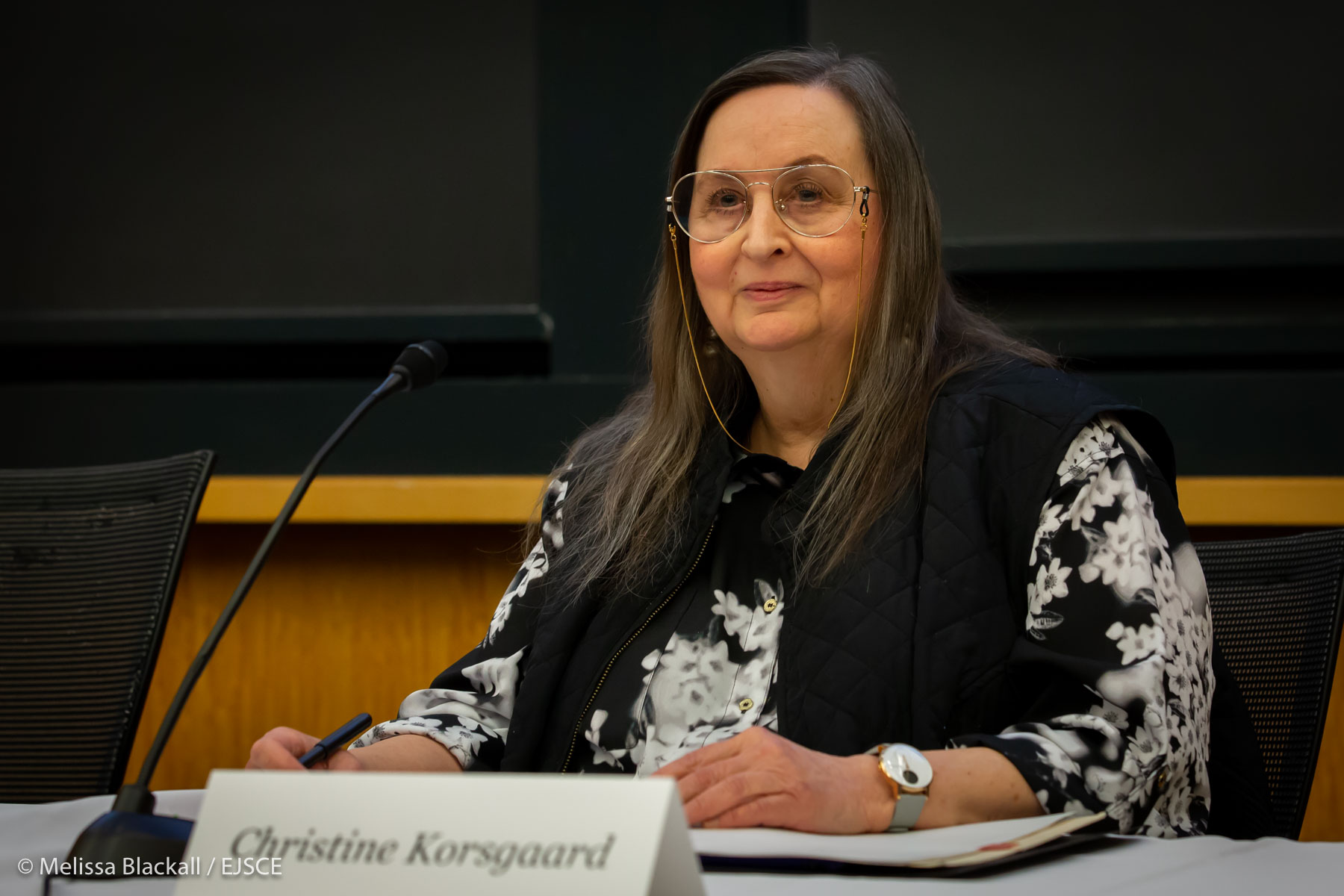
Korsgaard in 2019

She has taught at Yale, the University of California at Santa Barbara, and the University of Chicago; since 1991 she has been a professor at Harvard University, where she was Arthur Kingsley Porter Professor of Philosophy, and is now emerita.

In 1996, Korsgaard published a book entitled The Sources of Normativity, which was the revised version of her Tanner Lectures on Human Values, and also a collection of her past papers on Kant's moral philosophy and Kantian approaches to contemporary moral philosophy: Creating the Kingdom of Ends. In 2002, she was the first woman to give the John Locke Lectures at the University of Oxford, which turned into her 2009 book Self-Constitution: Agency, Identity, and Integrity.

She was elected a Fellow of the American Academy of Arts & Sciences in 2001 and a Corresponding Fellow of the British Academy in 2015. She served as President of the Eastern Division of the American Philosophical Association in 2008–2009, and held a Mellon Distinguished Achievement Award from 2006–2009.

== Animal rights ==
Korsgaard is an advocate of animal rights. She was a vegetarian for over 40 years and is now a vegan. In 2018, Korsgaard authored Fellow Creatures: Our Obligations to Other Animals which argues that Kantian ethics supports animal rights.

She has also given several lectures about animal rights, including the 2014 Uehiro Lectures on The Moral and Legal Standing of Animals. In these lectures, Korsgaard argues that importance is tethered to a creature who finds it important. While according to this view there is no "free-floating" untethered importance, there is absolute importance, which occurs when something is important to all beings. Therefore, to Korsgaard, the statement that animals are universally less important than humans is not incorrect, but incoherent. She distinguishes between the evaluative or functional good, where something is good because it is able to perform its function well, and the final good, where an end or a life is good. Final goods are what make things important, and a thing possesses the final good if things can be good or bad for that thing. She also distinguishes between ordinary objects such as knives, for which being sharpened is good in the sense that it helps the knife achieve its function of cutting well, organisms, which have a function to tend to their and their species' own well-functioning, and animals, a particular kind of organism which represent the world to themselves and act using this representation for the function of self-maintenance. This representation enables the animal to have self-maintenance not only as a functional good, but also as a final good. Therefore, final goods need not come from people, but from any animal. Korsgaard defines people as "normative self-governed beings" and says that the rational capacity to evaluate oneself and reflect on one's motives makes people different from animals. This means that while non-person animals are not responsible for their actions and do not have duties to other animals, people are and do. Further, she distinguishes between two different kinds of ends-in-of-themselves:

1. Something is an end-in-of-itself in the active sense if it is capable of legislating ends that one must respect.
2. Something is an end-in-of-itself in the passive sense if things that are good for it are good absolutely.

Clearly the active sense implies the passive sense, but Korsgaard departs from Kant in claiming that the converse fails. In fact, the choice to set a value on an end is made merely because one desires the end, because it is good with respect to the being making the choice; in other words, because it is a being with the final good. Therefore, when universalized using the formula of universal law, the being is committed to valuing the ends of all beings with the final good (animals). In other words, all animals are passive ends-in-of-themselves, but non-person are not active ends-in-of-themselves.

== Selected publications ==
=== Books ===
- (2018) Fellow Creatures: Our obligations to other animals, Oxford University Press, ISBN 978-0198753858.
- (2009) Self-Constitution: Agency, Identity, and Integrity, Oxford University Press.
- (2008) The Constitution of Agency, Oxford University Press.
- (1996a) The Sources of Normativity, New York: Cambridge University Press, ISBN 0-521-55059-9.
- (1996b) Creating the Kingdom of Ends, New York: Cambridge University Press, ISBN 0-521-49644-6.

=== Articles ===
- (1986) "Skepticism about Practical Reason," The Journal of Philosophy 83 (1): 5-25. (Reprinted in as ch.11 in Korsgaard (1996b), pp. 311–334.)
- (1997) "The Normativity of Instrumental Reason," ch. 8 in Garrett Cullity & Berys Gaut (eds.) Ethics and Practical Reason, Oxford: Clarendon Press, pp. 215–54. (Reprinted with Afterword in Korsgaard (2008), pp. 27–69.)

== See also ==
- American philosophy
- List of American philosophers
- List of animal rights advocates
