= Sui generis =

Latin phrase meaning in its own class

Sui generis (Note: /ˌsjuːaɪ ˈdʒɛnərɪs/ SEW-eye JEN-ər-iss, Classical Latin: [ˈsʊ.iː ˈɡɛnɛrɪs]) is a Latin phrase that means "of its/their own kind" or "in a class by itself", therefore "unique". It denotes an exclusion to the larger system an object is in relation to.

Several disciplines use the term to refer to unique entities. These include:

- Biology, for species that do not fit into a genus that includes other species (its own genus)
- Creative arts, for artistic works that go beyond conventional genre boundaries (its own genre)
- Law, when a special and unique interpretation of a case or authority is necessary (its own special case)
  - Intellectual property rights, for types of works not falling under general copyright law but protected through separate statutes
  - Laws of war, for types of actions that are argued to be legal due to exceptional circumstances in conflict
- Philosophy, to indicate an idea, an entity, or a reality that cannot be reduced to a lower concept or included in a higher concept (its own category)

== Biology ==
In the taxonomical structure "genus → species", a species is described as sui generis if its genus was created to classify it (i.e., its uniqueness at the time of classification merited the creation of a new genus, the sole member of which was initially the sui generis species). A species that is the sole extant member of its genus (e.g., the genus Homo) is not necessarily sui generis; extinctions may have eliminated other congeneric species. A sui generis genus may also be called a monotypic genus.

== Creative arts ==
A book, movie, television series, or other artistic creation is called sui generis when it does not fit into standard genre boundaries. Movie critic Richard Schickel identifies Joe Versus the Volcano as a sui generis movie. Film critic Michael Brooke used the term to describe Fantastic Planet, a 1973 Franco-Czech sci-fi animated film directed by René Laloux.

== Law ==
In law, it is a term of art used to identify a legal classification that exists independently of other categorizations, either because of its singularity or due to the specific creation of an entitlement or obligation. For example, a court's contempt powers arise sui generis and not from statute or rule. The New York Court of Appeals has used the term in describing cooperative apartment corporations, mostly because this form of housing is considered real property for some purposes and personal property for other purposes.

When citing cases and other authorities, lawyers and judges may refer to "a sui generis case", or "a sui generis authority", meaning it is a special one confined to its own facts and, therefore, may not be of broader application.

=== Intellectual property law ===
Generally speaking, protection for intellectual property extends to intellectual creations to incentivize innovation and depends upon the nature of the work and its characteristics. The main types of intellectual property law are: copyright, which protects creative works; patent, which protects invention; trade secret, which protects information not generally known or readily ascertainable that is valuable to the secret holder; and trademark, which protects branding and other exclusive properties of products and services. Any matter that meets these criteria can be protected.

Sui generis statutes exist in many countries that extend intellectual property protection to matter that does not meet characteristic definitions. For example, integrated circuit layouts, ship hull designs, fashion designs in France, databases, and plant varieties require sui generis statutes because of their unique characteristics. The United States, Japan, Australia, and many EU countries protect the topography of semiconductor chips and integrated circuits under sui generis laws, which borrow some aspects from patent or copyright law. In the U.S., this sui generis law is known as the Semiconductor Chip Protection Act of 1984.

=== Statutory law ===
In statutory interpretation, sui generis refers to the problem of giving meaning to groups of words where one of the words is ambiguous or inherently unclear.

In road traffic law, a statute may require consideration of large vehicles separately from other vehicles. The word "large" is ambiguous per se but may be considered "heavy". The relevant legislation (in Australian law) contain sections called "Terms used" or "Definitions" that itemise all words deemed ambiguous and confers specific interpretations consistent with natural language. One indicates "heavy vehicle" means a vehicle with a GVM over 4.5 tons, and GVM means "gross vehicle mass", the maximum loaded mass of the vehicle. Further explanations cover various contingencies. Thus, "large" is equivalent to "heavy" and is (for this unique case) clearly defined sui generis.

In U.S. attorney admissions, an applicant for admission to the practice of law may be referred to the state committee on character and fitness, where proceedings are "neither civil nor criminal, but are sui generis".

=== Town planning law ===
In town and country planning in the United Kingdom, in particular, relating to the Town and Country Planning (Use Classes) Order 1987, many common types of land use are categorised into specific "use classes". Change of use of land within a use class does not require planning permission; changing between use classes might require planning permission, and approval is always needed if the new use is sui generis.

Examples of sui generis uses include embassies, theatres, amusement arcades, laundrettes, taxi or vehicle hire businesses, petrol filling stations, scrapyards, nightclubs, motor car showrooms, retail warehouses, clubs and hostels. As of 1 September 2020 following the Town and Country Planning (Use Classes) (Amendment) (England) Regulations 2020, the following uses were added as sui generis:

- public houses, wine bars, or drinking establishments (previously Class A4)
- drinking establishments with expanded food provision (previously Class A4)
- hot food takeaways (previously Class A5)
- venues for live music performance
- cinemas (previously Class D2(a))
- concert halls (previously D2(b))
- bingo halls (previously D2(c))
- dance halls (previously D2(d))

The grant of private hire vehicle (taxicab) operators licences by local authorities frequently has a condition that the appropriate sui generis change of use planning permission is granted to those premises to ensure those businesses cannot trade lawfully without the relevant planning consent.

=== International law ===
When applied to international law, "sui generis" refers to situations which are distinct and thus not easily categorized under existing legal frameworks or conventions. Sui generis in international law may suggest novel legal frameworks to address unprecedented issues using a new set of legal principles. For example, the legal status of the internet or space law. Sui generis systems can be crucial in international law because they allow the international community to develop adaptive legal responses to emerging global challenges and contexts that are not adequately addressed by traditional international law. They often also serve as precursors to the evolution of wider customary international law or the development of new treaties and conventions. The uniqueness of sui generis legal regimes can sometimes make them challenging to interpret, enforce, or harmonize with existing legal frameworks.

Another example of Sui Generis can be seen in the field of laws of war in international law. According to scholar Noura Erakat in Justice for Some: Law and Question of Palestine (2019), especially within the period of the Second Intifada of the Israeli–Palestinian conflict, Israel uses the concept of Sui Generis to justify its military actions in the occupied territories, in contravention of pre-existing legal norms. She refers to its use of military pre-emptive strikes towards Palestinians suspected of being involved with Palestinian militant organisations such as in the West Bank and Gaza Strip. Erakat highlights its use of Sui Generis through the legal inconsistencies that arises when balancing Israel´s responsibility as the occupying power of the west bank and its justification for its use of preemptive strikes. Another example Erakat refers to is Israel's legal interpretation of the laws of war in The Second Intifada. Erakat argues that, to not grant Palestinian militant groups the rights of belligerent groups and to non-combatants in the occupied territories given by the international laws of conflict, it had argued that conflict as "short of war", under the concept of Sui Generis. This for Erakat, allowed Israel to wield international law in order to fulfill its aims during the conflict without following the pre-existing legal conventions regarding armed conflict.

== Philosophy ==
Analytic philosophy often uses the expression to indicate an idea, an entity, or a reality that cannot be reduced to a lower concept or included in a higher concept. G. E. Moore, for example, refuted reductive ethical naturalism in moral theories like utilitarianism by arguing that moral properties (like good or bad) could not be reduced to or equated with non-moral properties (like pleasure) because moral properties are sui generis. This can be seen in Moore's open-question argument.

== Politics and society ==
In political philosophy, the unparalleled development of the European Union as compared with other international organizations has led to its designation as a sui generis geopolitical entity. The legal nature of the EU is widely debated because its mixture of intergovernmental and supranational elements causes it to share characteristics with both confederal and federal entities. It is generally considered more than a confederation but less than a federation, thus being appropriately classified as an instance of neither political form. Compared to other international organizations, the EU is often considered "sui generis" because its legal system comprehensively rejects any use of retaliatory sanctions by one member state against another.

A similar case that led to the use of the label sui generis is the relationship of New Caledonia relative to France because the legal status of New Caledonia can aptly be said to lie somewhere between a French overseas collectivity and a sovereign nation. Although other examples of such status for further dependent or disputed territories may exist, this arrangement is unique within the French realm.

The legal status of the Holy See is also described as a sui generis entity possessing an international personality. The Sovereign Military Order of Malta has likewise been described as a "sui generis primary subject of public international law". Another entity widely considered to have sui generis international legal personality is the International Committee of the Red Cross.

In local government, a sui generis entity does not fit with a country's general scheme of local governance. For example, in England, the City of London and the Isles of Scilly are the two sui generis localities, as their forms of local government are both (for historical or geographical reasons) very different from those of elsewhere in the country. In a press conference during which reporters were trying to analyse his political personality, Huey Long said "say that I am sui generis, and let it go at that".

The Joint Council of Municipalities in Croatia is a sui generis council of municipalities in the east of the country that was formed after the Erdut Agreement and UNTAES mission aimed at protection of the rights of the ethnic Serb community in the region and is, as such, a unique form of local cooperation and minority self-government in Croatia.

=== Sociology ===
In sociology, methodological holists argue that social phenomena exist in their own right (sui generis) and are not reducible to the actions of individuals. For example, Emile Durkheim argued that the suicide rate was a social phenomenon sui generis (existing over and above the actions of individuals) In a social constructionist perspective, "sui generis" is what has been externalized, then internalized in the overall public and becomes a part of society that exists in its construct. It is not something that is not thought to have been created because it is embedded in everyone's way of thinking and being. Instances include love, going to school, or clothing belonging to a specific gender. These examples are sui generis for they exist in society and are widely accepted without thoughts of where they come from or how they were created.

== See also ==
- Ad hoc – Conventional Latin phrase
- Language isolate – Language that has no demonstrable genetic relationship with other languages
- List of Latin phrases
- List of Latin legal terms – List of Latin terms used in legal terminology
- Hapax legomenon, a word or term only found once within a language history or body of work
