= Cornell realism =

Meta-ethical school of thought

Cornell realism is a view in meta-ethics, associated with the work of Richard Boyd, Nicholas Sturgeon, and David Brink, who earned his Ph.D. at Cornell University. There is no recognized and official statement of Cornell realism, but several theses are associated with the view. Boyd's contribution includes the homeostatic property cluster account of kinds, introduced in his 1988 essay "How to Be a Moral Realist", on which moral goodness is a cluster of human goods held together by psychological and social mechanisms.

== Moral realism ==
Moral realism is the view that there are mind-independent, and therefore objective, moral facts that moral judgments are in the business of describing. This combines a cognitivist view that moral judgments are belief-like mental states in the business of describing the way the world is, a view that moral facts exist, and a view that the nature of moral facts is objective; independent of our cognizing them or our stance towards them.

This contrasts with expressivist theories of moral judgment (e.g., Stevenson, Hare, Blackburn, Gibbard), error-theoretic/fictionalist denials of the existence of moral facts (e.g., Mackie, Richard Joyce, and Kalderon), and constructivist or relativist theories of the nature of moral facts (e.g., Firth, Rawls, Korsgaard, Harman).

== Motivational externalism ==
Cornell realism accepts motivational externalism, which is the view that moral judgments need not have any motivational force at all. A common way of explaining the thesis invokes the claim that amorality is possible – that there could be someone who makes moral judgments without feeling the slightest corresponding motivation. This gives Cornell realists a simple response to Humean arguments against cognitivism: if moral judgments do not have motivational force in the first place, there is no reason to think they are non-cognitive states. Some, like Brink, add to this motivational externalism an externalism about normative reasons, which denies that there is any necessary connection or relation between what one has reason to do and what one is motivated to do (or would be motivated to do, if one were fully rational and knew all of the facts).

== Naturalistic non-reductionism about metaphysics ==
Cornell realism accepts the view that moral facts are natural facts. They fall within the province of the natural and social sciences. But while they are not supernatural (as in divine command theory) and they are not non-natural (as in Moore's Principia Ethica or Mackie's picture of a realist world), they cannot be reduced to non-moral natural facts. That is, while moral facts are natural facts and supervene on non-moral natural facts, they cannot be identified with non-moral natural facts.

== Non-reductionism about semantics ==
There is no reductive connection between moral terms and concepts and natural terms and concepts. This gives Cornell realists a simple response to the charge that you cannot have naturalism without naturalistic fallacy: namely, that metaphysical reduction doesn't imply semantic reduction. This usually goes with a Kripke-Putnam semantic story: moral terms and concepts pick out certain natural properties in virtue of those properties standing in an appropriate causal (social-historical) relation to our tokenings of the terms and concepts.

== Bibliography ==
- Boyd, Richard "How to Be A Moral Realist", In G. Sayre-McCord (ed.), Essays on Moral Realism. Cornell University Press. pp. 181–228 (1988)
- Blackburn, Simon Ruling Passions, Clarendon Press, Oxford 2000, pp. 119–121
- Lenman, James (21 March 2014) [2006]. "Moral naturalism". In Zalta, Edward N. (ed.). Stanford encyclopedia of philosophy. Stanford, California: Stanford University. § Cornell realism. ISSN 1095-5054.
