= Bernard Davis (biologist) =

American biologist

- Born: 7 January 1916; Franklin, Massachusetts, USA
- Died: 14 January 1994 (aged 78); Belmont, Massachusetts, USA
- Education: Harvard University
- Known for: Moralistic fallacy
- Spouse: Elizabeth Menzel
- Children: Three
- Awards: Selman A. Waksman Award in Microbiology
- Scientific career
- Fields: Biochemistry, physiology
- Workplaces: Harvard Medical School

Bernard David Davis (January 7, 1916 – January 14, 1994) was an American biologist who made major contributions in microbial physiology and metabolism. Davis was a prominent figure at Harvard Medical School in microbiology and in national science policy. He was the 1989 recipient of the Selman A. Waksman Award in Microbiology from the National Academy of Sciences.

== Education ==
Davis was born in Franklin, Massachusetts, where his parents, Jewish immigrants from Lithuania, had settled. He was valedictorian at his high school, then attended Harvard University, where he majored in biochemistry. After earning his Bachelor of Science degree, he enrolled at Harvard Medical School, graduating in 1940 with a rare M.D., summa cum laude. He was elected a Fellow of the American Academy of Arts and Sciences in 1958. In a front-note to a posthumously published commentary that appeared in 2000, the major contributions of Davis to microbial physiology has been noted as, "the use of penicillin for the selection of auxotrophic mutants and his U-tube experiment to prove that bacterial conjugation required direct contact between the two bacterial strains."

== Moralistic fallacy ==
In a short article published in Nature in 1978, Davis coined the term "moralistic fallacy" after calls for ethical guidelines to control the study of what could allegedly become "dangerous knowledge." The term was intended as a converse to the naturalistic fallacy, a term coined by G.E. Moore in the early twentieth century but often applied to certain related views of David Hume in the eighteenth century. Hume pointed out the logical fallacy that occurs when deductive reasoning jumps from statements about what is to prescriptions about what ought to be. Davis thus referred to the "moralistic fallacy" as "in effect, an illogical effort to derive an 'is' from an 'ought'."

Sometimes a theory is rejected with a reference to the danger of misuse. In doing so, one fails to differentiate sufficiently clearly between its epistemological value and its practical value, or between the moral, value-free knowledge and – in consideration of moral valuations – the potentially negative consequences of the knowledge. From a perspective of scientific theory, the accuracy of a theory is relevant, not its practical value, its origin or history of use. No theory is protected against misuse, nor can a theory be falsified by misuse. Both misuse as well as renunciation of knowledge can have disadvantageous consequences.

An example of the naturalistic fallacy would be approving of all wars if scientific evidence showed warfare was part of human nature, whereas an example of the moralistic fallacy would be claiming that, because warfare is wrong, it cannot be part of human nature.

== On scientific writing ==
On the current format of scientific writing, Davis had opined, "A scientific paper is an unusual art form. It has to be as compact as possible, while giving the reader all the information needed to repeat the experiments. Because the literature is vast, the format of a paper is standardized so the reader can quickly find the parts that interest him; readers skim most of the papers that they look at, except those very close to their interests. The aim is efficient, impersonal transmission of the essentials, rather than a narrative account of the steps along the way."
