= Open question =

Open question may refer to:

- Open-ended question, a question that cannot be answered with a "yes" or "no" response
- Open problem, or open question, a known problem which can be accurately stated, and which is assumed to have an objective and verifiable solution, but which has not yet been solved
- Open-question argument, a philosophical argument put forward by British philosopher G. E. Moore

== See also ==
- Naturalistic fallacy
