= David O. Brink =

American philosopher (born 1958)

- Born: David Owen Brink; January 16, 1958 (age 68); Minneapolis, Minnesota, U.S.

Education
- Education: University of Minnesota; Cornell University
- Doctoral advisor: Terence Irwin
- Other advisor: David Lyons

Philosophical work
- Era: Contemporary philosophy
- Region: Western philosophy
- School: Analytic philosophy Cornell realism
- Institutions: Case Western Reserve University; MIT; University of California, San Diego
- Main interests: Ethics, political philosophy, philosophy of law
- Notable ideas: Naturalistic forms of moral realism

David Owen Brink (born 1958) is an American philosopher who is Distinguished Professor of Philosophy at the University of California, San Diego (UCSD). He works in the areas of moral, political, and legal philosophy.

== Education and career ==
In 1984, Brink earned his Ph.D. in philosophy at Cornell University under Terence Irwin. He taught for two years at Case Western Reserve University, and then from 1987 to 1994 at MIT before joining the faculty at UCSD.

== Philosophical views ==
Brink is associated with the view known as "Cornell realism." Cornell realism was developed in the 1980s by the philosophers Richard Boyd and Nicholas Sturgeon, both faculty members at Cornell University. The view combines moral realism with moral naturalism. Moral realism holds that ethical judgments, such as "murder is wrong," are factual claims similar to "Albany is the Capital of New York" in being objectively true or objectively false. Moral naturalism holds that moral properties – such as the properties of being right, wrong, good, bad, virtuous or vicious – are natural properties that have a status comparable to other natural properties, such as those of being a tiger, being gold, or being an electron.

== Selected works ==
- Mill's Progressive Principles (Oxford: Clarendon Press, 2013).
- Perfectionism and the Common Good: Themes in the Philosophy of T.H. Green (Oxford: Clarendon Press, 2003).
- Moral Realism and the Foundations of Ethics (New York: Cambridge University Press, 1989)
