= Big Book =

Big Book may refer to:

- Big Book (award), a Russian literary award for best prose in Russian
- Big Book (thought experiment), involving ethics developed by Ludwig Wittgenstein
- The Big Book (Alcoholics Anonymous)
- Big (picture book), 2023 American children's book by Vashti Harrison
- The Big Book Of, a series of graphic novel anthologies published by the DC Comics imprint Paradox Press.
- The Big Read, a 2003 survey carried out by the BBC, with the goal of finding the "Nation's Best-loved Book" by way of a viewer vote via the Web, SMS and telephone
