= Moral realism =

Philosophical position

Moral realism (also ethical realism) is the position that some ethical sentences are objectively true.

Moral realism is a non-nihilist form of ethical cognitivism (which accepts that ethical sentences express propositions and can therefore be true or false) with an ontological orientation, standing in opposition to all forms of moral anti-realism and moral skepticism, including ethical subjectivism (which denies that moral propositions refer to objective facts), error theory (which denies that any moral propositions are true), and non-cognitivism (which denies that moral sentences express propositions at all). Moral realism's two main subdivisions are ethical naturalism and ethical non-naturalism.

Most philosophers claim that moral realism dates at least to Plato as a philosophical doctrine and that it is a fully defensible form of moral doctrine. A 2009 survey involving 3,226 respondents from mostly English-speaking universities, including mostly faculty members, PhDs and graduate students, found that 56% accept or lean toward moral realism (28%: anti-realism; 16%: other). A 2020 study found that 62.1% accept or lean toward realism. Some notable examples of robust moral realists include David O. Brink, John McDowell, Peter Railton, Geoffrey Sayre-McCord, Michael A. Smith, Terence Cuneo, Russ Shafer-Landau, G. E. Moore, John Finnis, Richard Boyd, Nicholas Sturgeon, Thomas Nagel, Derek Parfit, and Peter Singer. Norman Geras has argued that Karl Marx was a moral realist. Moral realism's various philosophical and practical applications have been studied.

== Robust versus minimal moral realism ==
A delineation of moral realism into a minimal form, a moderate form, and a robust form has been put forward in the literature.

The robust model of moral realism commits moral realists to three theses:

- The semantic thesis: The primary semantic role of moral predicates (such as "right" and "wrong") is to refer to moral properties (such as rightness and wrongness), so that moral statements (such as "honesty is good" and "slavery is unjust") purport to represent moral facts, and express propositions that are true or false (or approximately true, largely false, and so on).
- The alethic thesis: Some moral propositions are in fact true.
- The metaphysical thesis: Moral propositions are true when actions and other objects of moral assessment have the relevant moral properties (so that the relevant moral facts obtain), where these facts and properties are robust: their metaphysical status, whatever it is, is not relevantly different from that of (certain types of) ordinary non-moral facts and properties.

The minimal model leaves off the metaphysical thesis, treating it as matter of contention among moral realists (as opposed to between moral realists and moral anti-realists). This dispute is significant, as acceptance or rejection of the metaphysical thesis is taken by those employing the robust model as the key difference between moral realism and moral anti-realism. Indeed, the question of how to classify certain logically possible (if eccentric) views—such as the rejection of the semantic and alethic theses in conjunction with the acceptance of the metaphysical thesis—turns on which model we accept. Someone employing the robust model might call such a view "realist non-cognitivism", while someone employing the minimal model might simply place such a view alongside other, more traditional, forms of non-cognitivism.

The robust model and the minimal model also disagree over how to classify moral subjectivism (roughly, the view that moral facts are not mind-independent in the relevant sense, but that moral statements may still be true). The historical association of subjectivism with moral anti-realism in large part explains why the robust model of moral realism has been dominant—even if only implicitly—both in the traditional and contemporary philosophical literature on metaethics.

In the minimal sense of realism, R. M. Hare could be considered a realist in his later works, as he is committed to the objectivity of value judgments, even though he denies that moral statements express propositions with truth-values per se. Moral constructivists like John Rawls and Christine Korsgaard may also be realists in this minimalist sense; the latter describes her own position as procedural realism. Some readings of evolutionary science such as those of Charles Darwin and James Mark Baldwin have suggested that in so far as an ethics may be associated with survival strategies and natural selection then such behavior may be associated with a moderate position of moral realism equivalent to an ethics of survival.

== Ethical objectivism ==
Moral objectivism is the view that what is right or wrong does not depend on what anyone thinks is right or wrong. Moral objectivism allows for moral codes to be compared to each other through a set of universal facts. Nicholas Reschar says that moral codes cannot derive from one's personal moral compass. An example is Immanuel Kant's categorical imperative: "Act only according to that maxim [i.e., rule] whereby you can at the same time will that it become a universal law." John Stuart Mill proposed utilitarianism, which asserts that in any situation, the right thing to do is whatever is likely to produce the most happiness overall.

According to the ethical objectivist, the truth of typical moral judgments does not depend upon any person's or group of persons' beliefs or feelings. This view holds that moral propositions are analogous to propositions about chemistry, biology, or history, insomuch as they are true despite what anyone believes, hopes, wishes, or feels. When they fail to describe this mind-independent moral reality, they are false—no matter what anyone believes, hopes, wishes, or feels.

There are many versions of ethical objectivism, including various religious views of morality, Platonistic intuitionism, Kantianism, utilitarianism, and certain forms of ethical egoism and contractualism. Platonists define ethical objectivism even more narrowly, so that it requires the existence of intrinsic value. Consequently, they reject the idea that contractualists or egoists could be ethical objectivists. Objectivism, in turn, places primacy on the origin of the frame of reference and considers any arbitrary frame of reference a form of ethical subjectivism by a transitive property, even when the frame incidentally coincides with reality.

== Advantages ==
Moral realism allows the ordinary rules of logic (modus ponens, etc.) to be applied straightforwardly to moral statements. We can say that a moral belief is false or unjustified or contradictory in the same way we would about a factual belief. This is a problem for expressivism, as shown by the Frege–Geach problem.

Another advantage of moral realism is its capacity to resolve moral disagreements: if two moral beliefs contradict one another, realism says that they cannot both be right, and therefore everyone involved ought to be seeking out the right answer to resolve the disagreement. Contrary theories of meta-ethics have trouble even formulating the statement "this moral belief is wrong," and so they cannot resolve disagreements in this way.

== Proponents ==
Richard Boyd defends a naturalistic moral realism according to which goodness is a homeostatic property cluster: a family of human goods whose co-occurrence is maintained by psychological and social mechanisms, with no analytic definition and no property necessary for every instance. Boyd calls this position "homeostatic consequentialism", and the account of kinds he introduced was applied widely outside ethics.

Peter Railton's moral realism is often associated with a naturalist approach. He argues that moral facts can be reduced to non-moral facts and that our moral claims aim to describe an objective reality. In his well-known paper "Moral Realism" (1986), Railton advocates for a form of moral realism that is naturalistic and scientifically accessible. He suggests that moral facts can be understood in terms of the naturalistic concept of an individual's good. He employs a hypothetical observer's standpoint to explain moral judgments. This standpoint considers what fully rational, well-informed, and sympathetic agents would agree upon under ideal conditions. Railton's naturalistic approach aims to bridge the is-ought gap by explaining moral facts in terms of natural facts, and his theory is generally considered to be a response to the challenge of moral skepticism and anti-realism. By doing so, he attempts to show that moral facts are not mysterious or disconnected from the rest of the world, but can be understood and studied much like other natural phenomena.

Philippa Foot adopts a moral realist position, criticizing Stevenson's idea that when evaluation is superposed on fact there has been a "committal in a new dimension." She introduces, by analogy, the practical implications of using the word "injury". Not just anything counts as an injury. There must be some impairment. When we suppose a man wants the things the injury prevents him from obtaining, have not we fallen into the old naturalistic fallacy?

It may seem that the only way to make a necessary connection between 'injury' and the things that are to be avoided, is to say that it is only used in an 'action-guiding sense' when applied to something the speaker intends to avoid. But we should look carefully at the crucial move in that argument, and query the suggestion that someone might happen not to want anything for which he would need the use of hands or eyes. Hands and eyes, like ears and legs, play a part in so many operations that a man could only be said not to need them if he had no wants at all.

Foot argues that the virtues, like hands and eyes in the analogy, play so large a part in so many operations that it is implausible to suppose that a committal in a non-naturalist dimension is necessary to demonstrate their goodness.

Philosophers who have supposed that actual action was required if 'good' were to be used in a sincere evaluation have got into difficulties over weakness of will, and they should surely agree that enough has been done if we can show that any man has reason to aim at virtue and avoid vice. But is this impossibly difficult if we consider the kinds of things that count as virtue and vice? Consider, for instance, the cardinal virtues, prudence, temperance, courage and justice. Obviously any man needs prudence, but does he not also need to resist the temptation of pleasure when there is harm involved? And how could it be argued that he would never need to face what was fearful for the sake of some good? It is not obvious what someone would mean if he said that temperance or courage were not good qualities, and this not because of the 'praising' sense of these words, but because of the things that courage and temperance are.

W. D. Ross articulates his moral realism in analogy to mathematics by stating that the moral order is just as real as "the spatial or numerical structure expressed in the axioms of geometry or arithmetic".

In his defense of Divine Command Theory and thereby moral realism, C. Stephen Evans comments that the fact that there are significant moral disagreements does not undermine moral realism. Much of what may appear to be moral disagreement is actually disagreement over facts. In abortion debates, for example, the crux of the issue may really be whether a fetus is a human person. He goes on to comment that there are in fact tremendous amounts of moral agreement. There are five common principles that are recognized by different human cultures, including (1) A general duty not to harm others and a general duty to benefit others; (2) Special duties to those with whom one has special relations, such as friends and family members; (3) Duties to be truthful; (4) Duties to keep one's commitments and promises; (5) Duties to deal fairly and justly with others.

== Criticisms ==
Several criticisms have been raised against moral realism. A prominent criticism, articulated by J.L. Mackie, is that moral realism postulates the existence of "entities or qualities or relations of a very strange sort, utterly different from anything else in the universe. Correspondingly, if we were aware of them it would have to be by some faculty of moral perception or intuition, utterly different from our ordinary ways of knowing everything else." Several theories have been developed for how we access objective moral truths, including ethical intuitionism and moral sense theory.

Another criticism of moral realism put forth by Mackie is that it can offer no plausible explanation for cross-cultural moral differences—ethical relativism. "The actual variations in the moral codes are more readily explained by the hypothesis that they reflect ways of life than by the hypothesis that they express perceptions, most of them seriously inadequate and badly distorted, of objective values".

The evolutionary debunking argument suggests that because human psychology is primarily produced by evolutionary processes which do not seem to have a reason to be sensitive to moral facts, taking a moral realist stance can only lead to moral skepticism. The argument aims to undercut the motivation for taking a moral realist stance, namely to be able to assert there are reliable moral standards.

Biologist Richard D. Alexander has written, "Ethical questions, and the study of morality or concepts of justice and right and wrong, derive solely from the existence of conflicts of interest", and that such conflicts are a necessary consequence of genetic individuality. He also wrote, "Because morality involves conflicts of interest, it cannot easily be generalized into a universal despite virtually continual efforts by utilitarian philosophers to do that; morality does not derive its meaning from sets of universals or undeniable facts." Alexander's views are shared by many scientists and starkly contradict moral realism.

== Beliefs among laypeople ==
A small amount of psychological research has explored the extent to which people perceive ethical beliefs as objective. A 2008 study by Geoffrey Goodwin and John M. Darley investigated how people evaluate ethical statements' objectivity compared to that of other types of claim, such as social conventions, tastes, and scientific facts. It found that people generally regard ethical statements as more objective than social conventions and tastes and as slightly less objective than scientific facts. A 2012 study by Goodwin and Darley found that beliefs about immoral actions are generally perceived as more objective than beliefs about moral ones, and that the perceived consensus about a moral belief increases its perceived objectivity. The study also indicated that holding a moral belief to be objective is associated with a less tolerant response to disagreement, and with more negative attributions toward those who disagree.

== See also ==
- Cognitivism
- Cornell realism
- Emotivism
- Evolution of morality
- Instrumental convergence
- Moral absolutism
- Moral relativism
- Morality
- Nominalism
- The Right and the Good
