= Terence Irwin =

Irish philosopher (born 1947)

T. H. Irwin FBA
- Born: Terence Henry Irwin; 21 April 1947 (age 79); Enniskillen, Northern Ireland
- Spouse: Gail Fine

Education
- Education: Magdalen College, Oxford; Princeton University
- Thesis: Theories of Virtue and Knowledge in Plato's Early and Middle Dialogues (1973)
- Doctoral advisor: Gregory Vlastos
- Other advisor: G. E. L. Owen

Philosophical work
- Era: Contemporary philosophy
- Region: Western philosophy
- School: Analytic philosophy
- Institutions: Harvard University; Cornell University; Keble College, Oxford
- Doctoral students: David O. Brink
- Main interests: Ancient philosophy, ethics

Terence Henry Irwin (/ˈɜːrwɪn/; born 21 April 1947), usually cited as T. H. Irwin, is a British scholar and philosopher specializing in ancient Greek philosophy and the history of ethics (i.e., the history of Western moral philosophy in ancient, medieval, and modern times). He spent most of his career at Cornell University before becoming the Professor of the History of Philosophy at the University of Oxford, and Fellow of Keble College, Oxford from 2007 until 2017.

== Education and career ==
Irwin was an undergraduate at Magdalen College, Oxford, where he graduated with a BA (first-class honours) in Literae Humaniores (Classics, Philosophy and Ancient History) in 1969. He then studied at Princeton University with Gregory Vlastos, and graduated with a PhD in philosophy in 1973.

He was assistant professor of philosophy at Harvard University (1972–1975) and then, from 1975 until 2007, he was at Cornell University, where he served as Susan Linn Sage Professor of Philosophy and Humane Letters (from 1995), Professor of Classics (from 1992), and Professor of Philosophy (from 1982). He moved to Oxford in 2007, and retired in 2017.

Irwin is a Fellow of both the American Academy of Arts and Sciences and the British Academy. He is married to Gail Fine, who was also a professor of philosophy at Cornell University and visiting professor of ancient philosophy at Oxford.

== Publications ==
- Plato's Moral Theory. Oxford: Oxford University Press, 1977. ISBN 0-19-824614-5
- Plato's Gorgias (translation and notes). Oxford: Oxford University Press, 1979. ISBN 0-19-872087-4
- Aristotle's Nicomachean Ethics (translation and notes). Indianapolis: Hackett Publishing Company, 1985. ISBN 0-915145-65-0
- Aristotle's First Principles. Oxford: Oxford University Press, 1988. ISBN 0-19-824717-6
- Classical Thought. OPUS Series. Oxford: Oxford University Press, 1988. ISBN 0-19-219196-9
- Plato's Ethics. Oxford: Oxford University Press, 1995. ISBN 0-19-508644-9
- The Development of Ethics, Vol. 1 (from Socrates to the Reformation). Oxford: Oxford University Press, 2007. ISBN 978-0-19-824267-3
- The Development of Ethics, Vol. 2 (from Suarez to Rousseau). Oxford: Oxford University Press, 2008. ISBN 978-0-19-954327-4
- The Development of Ethics, Vol. 3 (from Kant to Rawls). Oxford: Oxford University Press, 2009. ISBN 978-0-19-957178-9

In addition, Irwin has published over 100 essays and articles in journals and volumes of conference proceedings.
