= J. D. Trout =

American cognitive scientist (born 1959)

- Born: John Dewain Trout; 1959 (age 66–67)

Education
- Education: Cornell University (PhD, 1988)
- Thesis: Attribution, Content, and Method: A Scientific Defense of Commonsense Psychology (1988)
- Doctoral advisor: Richard Boyd

Philosophical work
- Era: Contemporary philosophy
- Region: Western philosophy
- School: Analytic philosophy
- Institutions: Loyola University, Chicago, Illinois Institute of Technology
- Main interests: Philosophy of science, philosophy of psychology, cognitive science

J. D. Trout (born 1959) is an American philosopher of science, cognitive scientist, lecturer and nonfiction author who holds the Calamos Endowed Chair in Philosophy at Illinois Institute of Technology. His research centers on the nature of scientific progress, and its influence on human understanding and well-being.

== Education and career ==
Trout was born in Cleveland to a mother of Sicilian and Irish heritage, a member of the WAVES in the U.S. Navy. He attended public schools in the Cleveland and the greater Philadelphia area, where he learned to box, drove a Class 2 vehicle, and flirted with a career in opera.

Trout received his bachelor's degree in philosophy and history at Bucknell University in 1982 and his doctorate in philosophy at Cornell University in 1988 under the supervision of Richard Boyd. He taught at Loyola University, Chicago for most of his career until moving to IIT in 2018.

Trout was a National Science Foundation Predoctoral Fellow and a Sage Graduate Fellow at Cornell University. In 1988–89, Trout was a Mellon Postdoctoral Fellow at Bryn Mawr College, and a Choice Award winner for his 1998 book Measuring the Intentional World. He was a visiting professor at the University of Innsbruck in 1999. In 2005, he was a visiting professor of philosophy at the University of Chicago and a visiting scholar at the Graduate School of Business.

== Philosophical work ==
Trout authored a number of experimental and theoretical articles on speech perception, after having begun a parallel career in spoken language processing in his twenties. His work on philosophical and psychological topics often combine linguistics, biology, economics, history and public policy. Measuring the Intentional World: Realism, Naturalism, and Quantitative Methods in the Behavioral Sciences contends that perceptual psychology and cognitive psychology, so often marginalized as unworthy of the name “science,” are emerging as mature fields, and deserve the kind of intellectual weight accorded physics and chemistry. This elevated status was then recruited to support a new version of scientific realism, called measured realism. In 2005 Trout, together with Michael Bishop, published Epistemology and the Psychology of Human Judgment. The book argues that the theory of knowledge, as practiced in the English-speaking world, has become a parochial and scholastic exercise, and should be replaced with ameliorative psychology – an area of psychology devoted to evaluating and improving decision-making. The Empathy Gap: Building Bridges from the Good Life to the Good Society, recruits scientific research on empathy, free will, and decision-making to explain how decent people can ignore indecent degrees of inequality and suffering, and constructs a concrete and realistic vision of policies that improve human well-being.

His most recent book, The Empathy Gap, makes the case that a fair and humane democracy in modern times must turn to psychological science to forge policies that correct for people's natural imperfections.

== Selected publications ==
=== Books ===
- 1991. R. Boyd, P. Gasper, and J. D. Trout. Eds. The Philosophy of Science. Bradford Books/The MIT Press, Cambridge, MA. ISBN 0-262-52156-3.
- 1995. P. Moser and J. D. Trout. Eds. Contemporary Materialism: A Reader. Routledge, London and New York. ISBN 0-415-10864-0.
- 1998. J. D. Trout. Measuring the Intentional World: Realism, Naturalism, and Quantitative Methods in the Behavioral Sciences. Oxford, New York. Paperback 2003. ISBN 0-19-516659-0.
- 1998. P. Moser, D. Mulder, and J. D. Trout. The Theory of Knowledge: A Thematic Introduction. Oxford, New York. ISBN 0-19-509466-2.
- 2005. Michael A. Bishop and J. D. Trout. Epistemology and the Psychology of Human Judgment. New York: Oxford University Press; third printing in 2006. ISBN 0-19-516230-7.
- 2009. J. D. Trout. The Empathy Gap: Building Bridges to the Good Life and the Good Society. Viking/Penguin, New York, February 2009. ISBN 0-670-02044-3.

=== Articles ===
- 1990. Auditory and Visual Influences on Phonemic Restoration. Language and Speech, 33, 121-135 (with William Poser as second author).
- 1992. Theory-Conjunction and Mercenary Reliance. Philosophy of Science, 59, 231–245.
- 1994. A Realistic Look Backward. Studies in History and Philosophy of Science, 25 (1), 37–64.
- 2001. Metaphysics, Method and the Mouth: Philosophical Lessons of Speech Perception. Philosophical Psychology, 14, (3), 261–291.
- 2001. The Biological Basis of Speech: What to Infer from Talking to the Animals. Psychological Review, 108, (3), 523–549.
- 2002. 50 Years of Successful Predictive Modeling Should be Enough: Lessons for the Philosophy of Science. Philosophy of Science 68 (Proceedings): S197-S208 (with Michael Bishop).
- 2002. Scientific Explanation and the Sense of Understanding. Philosophy of Science 69(2), 212–233.
- 2003. Biological Specializations for Speech: What Can the Animals Tell Us? Current Directions in Psychological Science, 12(5, October), 155–159.
- 2005. Lexical Boosting of Noise-band Speech in Open- and Closed-set Formats. Speech Communication 47(4), 424–435.
- 2005. Paternalism and Cognitive Bias. Law and Philosophy 24(4, July), 393–434.
- 2005. The Pathologies of Standard Analytic Epistemology. Noûs 39 (4), 696-714 (with Michael Bishop).
- 2007. A Restriction Maybe, but is it Paternalism? Cognitive Bias and Choosing Governmental Decision Aids. NYU Journal of Law & Liberty, 2(3), 455–469.
- 2007. The Psychology of Scientific Explanation, Philosophy Compass, 2/3, 564–591.
- 2007. The Psychology of Discounting: A Policy of Balancing Biases. Public Affairs Quarterly, 21(2), 201–220.
- 2008. Seduction Without Cause: Uncovering Explanatory Neurophilia. Trends in Cognitive Sciences, 12, 281–282.
- 2008. Strategic Reliabilism: A Naturalistic Approach to Epistemology. Philosophy Compass, 3/5, 1049–1065.
