= Gail Fine =

American philosopher (born 1949)

- Born: 1949 (age 76–77)
- Spouse: Terence Irwin

Academic background
- Education: University of Michigan; University of Oxford; Harvard University (PhD)
- Thesis: Plato and Acquaintance (1975)
- Doctoral advisor: G. E. L. Owen

Academic work
- Institutions: Cornell University; University of Oxford
- Main interests: Ancient philosophy

Gail Judith Fine (born 1949) is an American philosopher. She is a professor of philosophy emerita at Cornell University. She was also a visiting professor of ancient philosophy at Oxford University, and a senior research fellow at Merton College, Oxford University.

== Education and career ==
Fine earned her B.A. from the University of Michigan (1971); and her MA (1973) and PhD from Harvard University (1975). She also holds an MA from Oxford University (2009). She taught at Cornell University since 1975 until her retirement. She is the recipient of fellowships from the NEH and ACLS. In 1992, she won Cornell's Clark Award for distinguished teaching.

Gail Fine is married to Terence Irwin, who was the professor of the history of philosophy at Oxford University and a fellow of Keble College, Oxford. In 2013, the Sage School of Philosophy at Cornell held a conference in honor of Gail Fine and Terence Irwin. She is the daughter of the American historian Sidney Fine.

== Philosophical work ==
Fine specializes in ancient philosophy. Fine's first book, On Ideas: Aristotle's Criticism of Plato's Theory of Forms, is the first full-length book in English to discuss Aristotle's lost essay Peri Ideôn (On Ideas). The essay survives only in fragments preserved by the Greek commentator Alexander, in his commentary on Aristotle's Metaphysics. In it, Aristotle formulates and criticizes a number of arguments for the existence of Platonic forms. Fine analyzes the arguments Aristotle ascribes to Plato and assesses his criticisms of them, asking whether he correctly interprets Plato's arguments for and views about the nature and existence of forms. She also considers aspects of Aristotle's alternative epistemological and metaphysical views, and relates both his and Plato's views to contemporary issues in metaphysics, such as the distinction between universals and particulars, the range of universals, and whether they can exist uninstantiated.

Fine's second book, Plato on Knowledge and Forms: Selected Essays, collects 15 articles on Plato's metaphysics and epistemology. Among the topics these essays consider are Meno's paradox; knowledge and belief in Republic 5–7; the Theaeteteus; the separation of forms; whether forms are immanent; and forms as causes.

Both On Ideas and Plato on Knowledge and Forms were the subject of book symposia at sessions of the American Philosophical Association.

Her third book, The Possibility of Inquiry: Meno's Paradox from Socrates to Sextus was published by Oxford University Press in 2014.

She is also the editor of The Oxford Handbook of Plato (Oxford University Press, 2008) and of Plato 1 and 2 in the Oxford Readings in Philosophy series (1999).

She is perhaps best known for her work in four main areas:

1. Meno's paradox. Fine argues that Meno's paradox is valid but contains a false premise, viz. that one can't inquire into what one doesn't know. For mere true beliefs aren't knowledge but, if one has and relies on them, one can inquire and discover; prior knowledge (in this life) isn't needed. She also argues, against a familiar view, that the theory of recollection doesn't posit innate knowledge (or true beliefs or concepts), but only prenatal knowledge. She defends her current views on Meno's Paradox in her recent book, The Possibility of Inquiry: Meno's Paradox from Socrates to Sextus (Oxford, 2014), where she discusses not only the Meno but also replies to Meno's Paradox in Aristotle, the Epicureans and Stoics, and Sextus.
2. Knowledge and belief in Republic 5. Fine challenges the traditional view that Plato extensively argues a "Two Worlds Theory", according to which one can know, but not have beliefs about forms; and one can have beliefs about, but not know, sensibles. Fine argues, by contrast, that Plato argues only that, to have any knowledge at all, one must know forms, but one can then use that knowledge so as to know sensibles as well. Fine also argues that Plato allows beliefs about both forms and sensibles.
3. Her work on Aristotle's criticism of Plato, especially in her book On Ideas (see above), but also in various articles. In, for example, "Separation", she argues that when Aristotle criticizes Plato for separating forms, he means just that Plato takes forms to be capable of existing without being instantiated; since forms are universals, this means that he allows universals to exist uninstantiated. Though the view that universals can exist uninstantiated is controversial, it is not clear why Aristotle treats it with such hostility; the explanation, Fine argues, has to do with Aristotle's own metaphysical commitments. On this notion of separation, forms can be both separate and immanent and, in Fine's view, Plato thinks they are both, unlike many scholars who think separation and immanence are incompatible. Fine's views on separation have often been discussed.
4. Her defense of the view that Plato accepts a coherentist account of justification, a view she takes Plato to defend in (among other works) the Republic and Theaetetus. Her work on this topic has often been discussed, ranging from A. Nehamas, "Episteme and Logos in Plato's Later Thought", Archiv für Geschichte der Philosophie 66 (1984), 11–36 to C.C.W. Taylor, "Plato's Epistemology" and M. Lee, Theaetetus, both in the Oxford Handbook of Plato.

== Awards and fellowships ==
Fine has received four NEH fellowships (1978–78; spring, 1980; 1982–83; and 2004–05. She has also received an American Council of Learned Societies fellowship (1990-1), and the Cornell Clark Award for Distinguished Teaching.

== Selected publications ==
Sole author

- On Ideas: Aristotle's Criticism of Plato's Theory of Forms (OUP, 1993)
- Plato on Knowledge and Forms: Selected Essays (OUP, 2003)
- The Possibility of Inquiry: Meno's Paradox from Socrates to Sextus (OUP, 2014).

Editor

- The Oxford Handbook of Plato (OUP, 2008)
- Plato 1 and 2 for the Oxford Readings in Philosophy series (1999).

She has also written more than 50 articles.
