= Cooper H. Langford =

American-born Canadian chemist (1934–2018)

Cooper Harold Langford III FRSC (October 14, 1934 – March 11, 2018) was an American-born Canadian chemist.

== Biography ==
He was born to the philosopher Cooper Harold Langford and his first wife, Susan Coffman, in Ann Arbor, Michigan on October 14, 1934. He attended Harvard University as an undergraduate, and Northwestern University for graduate studies. His work at Northwestern and his postgraduate work at University College London and Columbia University resulted in the publication (with Harry B. Gray) of Ligand Substitution Processes (1966). The Langford-Gray classification remains an important tool to describe the mechanics of inorganic chemical reactions.

Langford taught at Amherst College in Amherst, Massachusetts, Carleton University in Ottawa, Canada, Concordia University in Montreal, Canada, and the University of Calgary in Calgary, Canada.

Committed throughout his life both to undergraduate teaching and research, his interests continued to expand throughout his career. His research in photochemistry contributed to environmental science (particularly soil decontamination, waste treatment, and small-community water systems). In collaboration with his wife, the economic historian Dr. Martha Whitney Langford (b. 1938- d. 2009), he pursued research into science policy in Canada, as well as the dynamics of scientific, economic, and entrepreneurial innovation.

He served as associate vice-rector for research at Concordia University, and as vice-president (Research) at the University of Calgary, as well as many roles in federal and provincial research agencies, and scientific organizations, including the Arctic Institute of North America, THECIS (The Center for Innovation Studies). and the Calgary Science Center (later known as Telus Spark). He was granted fellowship of the Royal Society of Canada in 1992.

Langford was the co-author of two significant introductory chemistry textbooks. The Development of Chemical Principles (1969, reprinted 1995, with Ralph A. Beebe) was designed to guide undergraduate students through the fundamentals of chemistry by following the history of their development. He also co-wrote the first and second editions of Inorganic Chemistry (1990, with Peter Atkins and Duard F. Shriver).

Cooper died of pancreatic cancer on March 11, 2018, while seeking treatment at the Vernon Jubilee Hospital in Vernon, British Columbia.
