= George Moore (physician) =

George Moore (1803–1880) was an English physician and British Israelite. He was the paternal grandfather of Thomas Sturge Moore and G. E. Moore.

== Career ==
After attending Abernethy's lectures and surgical practice at St. Bartholomew's Hospital, London, he studied anatomy in Paris in company with Erasmus Wilson, and attended Dupuytren's practice. In 1829, he became M.R.C.S. England, in 1830 L.S.A., in 1841 M.D. St. Andrews, in 1843 ext. L.R.C.P., and in 1859 M.R.C.P.

He settled first at Camberwell, near London, where he practiced successfully for eight years. In March 1835, he obtained the Fothergillian gold medal for his essay on puerperal fever, which was favourably reviewed in the British and Foreign Medical Review (ii. 481). In 1838, his health broke down, and he moved to Hastings, where he remained for ten years. During part of this time, he was physician to the Hastings Dispensary, with his friend James Mackness as a colleague.

He published successful books on homely philosophy and quasi-psychology, becoming the Dr Spock of Victorian England by publishing in 1872 The training of young children on Christian and natural principles, which covered everything from nursery health to training for school and marriage.

== British Israelism ==
After reading John Wilson's Our Israelitish Origin (1840) Moore became an early proponent of British Israelism. In 1861, he published The Lost Tribes and the Saxons of the East and of the West with new Views of Buddhism, and Translations of Rock-Records in India, which was one of the earlier works on British Israelism, alongside John Wilson's and Charles Piazzi Smyth's works. Moore in his work was the first to propose that Gautama Buddha was an Israelite, an idiosyncratic view not held by many other British Israelites at the time.

== Newton Stone ==
Moore worked on attempting to decipher the Newton Stone. In Ancient Pillar Stones of Scotland, their Significance and Bearing on Ethnology (1865), Moore proposed that the "unknown script" on the Newton Stone was written in Hebrew-Bactrian by an ancient "Hebrew Buddhist missionary to Scotland".

Moore's decipherment was not popular with other scholars at the time, who considered the unknown script to be Latin or Old Irish, although some had proposed Phoenician.

== Works ==
The Minstrel's Tale, and other Poems (1826)

=== Medicine and psychology ===
The power of the soul over the body, considered in relation to health and morals (1847)
Man and his motives (1848)
Health, disease and remedy: familiarly & practically considered, in a few of their relations to the blood (1850)
The use of the body in relation to the mind (1852)
The first man and his place in creation (1866)
The training of young children on Christian and natural principles (1872)

=== British Israelism ===
The lost tribes and the Saxons of the east and of the west with new views of Buddhism, and translations of rock-records in India (1861)

=== Newton Stone ===
Ancient pillar stones of Scotland, their significance and bearing on ethnology (1865)
