= David Lyons (philosopher) =

American philosopher (born 1935)

- Born: February 6, 1935 (age 91)

Education
- Education: Brooklyn College; Harvard University
- Academic advisor: John Rawls

Philosophical work
- Era: Contemporary philosophy
- Region: Western philosophy
- School: Analytic
- Institutions: Cornell University; Boston University
- Notable students: David O. Brink
- Main interests: Philosophy of law, moral philosophy, political philosophy
- Notable ideas: Criticism of rule utilitarianism

David Lyons (born February 6, 1935) is an American moral, political and legal philosopher who is emeritus professor of philosophy and of law at Boston University after having spent much of his career at Cornell University where he held joint appointment in the College and Arts and Sciences and School of Law.

== Education and career ==
In 1963, Lyons earned his Ph.D. in philosophy from Harvard University.

Lyons was one of the faculty members in the Susan Linn Sage School of Philosophy within the Cornell University College of Arts and Sciences, joining it in 1964. Later he obtained a joint appointment with Cornell University School of Law. He also had a stint as chair of the Susan Linn Sage School (operationally the chair of the philosophy department). He taught at Cornell until 1995, when he joined the Boston University faculty. His former students include David O. Brink.

== Philosophical work ==
Lyons has had a lengthy career as a moral and legal philosopher, including such topics as the nature of rights and how they relate to concepts of the general welfare. He is particularly well known for his interpretation of the philosophy of John Stuart Mill, arguing that Mill's utilitarianism is compatible with recognizing the importance of rights.

In 2010, Lyons was honored by the Boston University School of Law with a two-day event, "Rights, Equality, and Justice: A Conference Inspired by the Moral and Legal Theory of David Lyons". The resulting papers from the conference were published in the Boston University Law Review.

== Books ==
- Moral Aspects of Legal Theory : Essays on Law, Justice and Political Responsibility. Cambridge : Cambridge University Press, 1999. ISBN 978-0-521-43244-3
  - Translated into Spanish as Aspectos morales de la teoria juridica : ensayos sobre la ley, la justicia y la responsabilidad política ISBN 978-84-7432-601-7
- Mill's Utilitarianism : Critical Essays (editor) Lanham (Md.) : Rowman & Littlefield, 1997. ISBN 978-0-8476-8783-1
- Rights, Welfare, and Mill's Moral Theory. New York: Oxford University Press, 1994.ISBN 9780195082180
- Ethics and the Rule of Law. Cambridge [Cambridgeshire]: Cambridge University Press, 1984. ISBN 978-0-521-27712-9 Held in over 1000 worldCat libraries.
  - Translated into Polish as Etyka i rządy prawa ISBN 978-83-7261-058-4
- Rights. (editor) The Wadsworth series in social philosophy. Belmont, Calif: Wadsworth Pub. Co, 1979. ISBN 978-0-534-00600-6
  - Translated into Spanish as Ética y derecho ISBN 978-84-344-1521-8
- In the Interest of the Governed; A Study in Bentham's philosophy of utility and law. Oxford, Clarendon Press, 1973. ISBN 978-0-19-824503-2
- Forms and Limits of Utilitarianism. Oxford: Clarendon Press, 1965. ISBN 978-0-19-824197-3
