= Cooper Harold Langford =

American philosopher (1895–1964)

- Born: August 25, 1895; Dublin, Logan County, Arkansas, U.S.
- Died: August 28, 1964 (aged 69); Ann Arbor, Michigan, U.S.
- Children: Cooper H. Langford

Education
- Education: University of Arkansas; Clark University (AB, 1920); Harvard University (PhD, 1924); University of Cambridge
- Doctoral advisor: Edwin Boring

Philosophical work
- Era: 20th-century philosophy
- Region: Western philosophy
- School: Analytic philosophy
- Institutions: University of Michigan (1929–1964); University of Washington (1927–1929); Harvard University (1925–1927)
- Doctoral students: Arthur Burks
- Main interests: Mathematical logic
- Notable ideas: Langford–Moore paradox Langford substitution test

Cooper Harold Langford (25 August 1895 – 28 August 1964) was an American analytic philosopher and mathematical logician who co-authored the book Symbolic Logic (1932) with C. I. Lewis. He is also known for introducing the Langford–Moore paradox.

== Biography ==
After spending his freshman year at the University of Arkansas, Langford transferred in 1915 to Clark University, where he received his A.B. degree in 1920. His college education was interrupted by World War I in 1917 when he joined the U.S. army and spent 20 months overseas. After receiving his A.B. degree, Langford enrolled in 1920 as a graduate student at Harvard University, where he earned his Ph.D. in psychology under Edwin Boring in 1924. With the aid of a Sheldon Traveling Fellowship, he studied logic and philosophy at Cambridge University during 1924–1925. Upon his return to the U.S., Langford became an instructor at Harvard from 1925 to 1927. After spending two academic years, 1927–1929, as an assistant professor at the University of Washington, he became in the autumn of 1929 an associate professor with tenure in the philosophy department at the University of Michigan. Langford became a full professor at the University of Michigan in 1933, remaining there for the rest of his career. In the academic year 1935–1936, he was a Guggenheim fellow, dividing his time between Vienna and Cambridge, England.

Langford is famous as co-author of the 1932 book Symbolic Logic and the system of modal logic S5. His doctoral students include Arthur Burks.

In the philosophy of language, Langford is known for the Langford substitution test. The test distinguishes used from merely mentioned expressions in a given sentence by translating the sentence into a different language (see Langford 1937). If the very same expression reoccurs in the translation, it was mentioned rather than used in the original sentence. If the expression does not reoccur and is replaced by some other (usually synonymous) expression, then it was used in the original sentence. This test is used by a famous argument from Alonzo Church concerning Rudolf Carnap's treatment of belief attributions and other analyses of beliefs as relations to sentences (see Church 1950).

Langford was married twice. His son Cooper H. Langford was a chemist.

== Selected works ==
- Langford, C. H. (1926). "On quantifiers for general propositions". Bull. Amer. Math. Soc. 32 (6): 694–704. doi:10.1090/s0002-9904-1926-04298-1. MR 1561292.
- Langford, C. H. (1927). "An analysis of some general propositions". Bull. Amer. Math. Soc. 33 (6): 666–672. doi:10.1090/s0002-9904-1927-04445-7. MR 1561444.
- Langford, C. H. (1927). "On inductive relations". Bull. Amer. Math. Soc. 33 (5): 599–607. doi:10.1090/s0002-9904-1927-04419-6. MR 1561425.
- Langford, C. H. (1927). "On a type of completeness characterizing the general laws for the separation of point-pairs". Trans. Amer. Math. Soc. 29 (1): 96–110. doi:10.1090/s0002-9947-1927-1501378-8. MR 1501378.
- Langford, C. H. (1928). "Concerning logical principles". Bull. Amer. Math. Soc. 34 (5): 573–582. doi:10.1090/s0002-9904-1928-04625-6. MR 1561620.
- Lewis, C.I.; Langford, Cooper Harold (1959) [1932]. Symbolic Logic (2 ed.). Dover Publications. ISBN 0-486-60170-6.
- Langford, C. H. (1937). "Review of: The Significs of Pasigraphic Systems by E. W. Beth". The Journal of Symbolic Logic. 2 (1): 53–54. doi:10.2307/2268834. JSTOR 2268834.
- Langford, C. H. (1949-01-06). "A Proof That Synthetic A Priori Propositions Exist". The Journal of Philosophy. 46 (1): 20–24. doi:10.2307/2019526. JSTOR 2019526.
