= Big Book (thought experiment) =

Ethical thought experiment from Ludwig Wittgenstein

The "Big Book" is a thought experiment developed by Ludwig Wittgenstein about the nature of ethics and the verifiability of ethical knowledge. This account is given by him in an early work, the 1929 Lecture on Ethics, and it matches also his position given in the early Tractatus Logico-Philosophicus (Proposition 6.41).

"All propositions are of equal value."

== The experiment ==
"No statement of fact can ever be, or imply, a judgment of absolute value. Suppose one of you were an omniscient person and therefore knew all the movements of all the bodies in the world dead or alive and that you also knew all the states of mind of all human beings that ever lived, and suppose you wrote all you knew in a big book, then this book would contain the whole description of the world; and what I want to say is, that this book would contain nothing that we would call an ethical judgment or anything that would logically imply such a judgment."

== Comparison to Wittgenstein's later positions ==
Just four years later, in 1933, in another lecture on ethics at Cambridge University, Wittgenstein seems to have taken up a very different view. Instead of saying that ethical propositions would not be part of a complete account (or a complete physical account, at least) of the world, Wittgenstein said in the 1933 lecture that an ethical quality like good should be discoverable like any other quality, and that a full investigation of some action would reveal whether it had this quality or not.

== See also ==
- Is–ought problem
