= Ethical naturalism =

Meta-ethical view

Ethical naturalism (also called moral naturalism or naturalistic definism) is a position in metaethics that holds that moral properties or facts are reducible to, or constituted by, natural properties (as understood within philosophical naturalism) and can in principle be investigated using empirical or scientific methods. It is generally regarded as a form of moral realism, since it maintains that moral statements can be true or false depending on features of the natural world.

Ethical naturalism contrasts with ethical non-naturalism, which maintains that moral properties are not reducible to, or constituted by, natural properties, and with forms of moral anti-realism, which deny the existence of objective moral facts.

Different versions of ethical naturalism identify moral properties with different kinds of natural properties, such as human well-being, preferences, or pleasure.

The position has appeared in several ethical traditions, including some forms of utilitarianism, virtue ethics, and evolutionary ethics. In contemporary metaethics it is often associated with views such as Cornell realism. Ethical naturalism has also been the subject of significant criticism, most notably G. E. Moore's open-question argument, which challenges the claim that moral properties can be fully defined in natural terms.

Debates about ethical naturalism also concern whether moral inquiry can be continuous with empirical investigation and scientific explanation, or whether moral concepts cannot be fully reduced to descriptive accounts of the natural world.

== Terminology ==
The terms ethical naturalism and moral naturalism are generally used interchangeably in contemporary metaethics. The label naturalistic definism was historically used in discussions of attempts to define moral concepts such as "good" in naturalistic terms, particularly in debates following Moore's criticisms.

== Overview ==
Ethical naturalism typically involves several related claims: that moral sentences express propositions, that some of these propositions are true, and that their truth depends on objective features of the world which are independent of human opinion and reducible to empirical or natural properties.

Ethical naturalism encompasses a range of views that attempt to reduce ethical properties, such as "goodness", to non-ethical properties. Different versions of ethical naturalism identify moral properties with different natural features, such as pleasure, human flourishing, or the satisfaction of preferences.

Many versions of ethical naturalism discussed in contemporary philosophy, such as Cornell realism, differ from the view that moral norms simply follow from how the world happens to be.

== Types of naturalism ==
Philosophers often distinguish between different forms of ethical naturalism, including reductive and non-reductive versions. Reductive naturalists attempt to define moral properties in terms of descriptive natural properties, whereas non-reductive naturalists maintain that moral properties are part of the natural world but cannot be reduced through simple analytic definitions.

One influential form of non-reductive ethical naturalism is associated with Cornell realism, a position developed by philosophers including Richard Boyd, Nicholas Sturgeon, and David O. Brink. Cornell realists argue that moral properties are natural properties and can play explanatory roles in scientific accounts of the world, even if they cannot be defined through simple conceptual analysis. On this view, moral properties are often understood by analogy with other theoretical properties in science, whose identities may be discovered through empirical investigation rather than through purely conceptual analysis.

This view emerged partly as a response to earlier criticisms of ethical naturalism, such as Moore's open-question argument, and attempts to defend moral realism while rejecting non-naturalist accounts of moral properties.

== History ==
Ideas associated with ethical naturalism appear in earlier philosophical traditions that attempted to explain morality in terms of human nature or natural facts. Elements of naturalistic thinking are often associated with Aristotle's account of human flourishing and virtue.

Twentieth-century metaethical debates renewed attention to whether moral properties could be identified with natural properties, particularly in response to criticisms such as Moore's open-question argument.

During the late twentieth century, several philosophers associated with so-called Cornell realism defended forms of ethical naturalism that attempted to reconcile moral realism with a broadly naturalistic worldview.

== Relation to moral realism ==
Ethical naturalism is generally considered a form of moral realism because it holds that moral statements can be objectively true or false. However, it differs from non-naturalist forms of realism in claiming that moral facts ultimately depend on natural features of the world.

== Fact–value distinction ==
Ethical naturalism is frequently discussed in relation to the fact–value distinction and the is-ought problem. Naturalist theories are often presented as challenging strong interpretations of this distinction by arguing that moral facts are grounded in natural facts about human behavior or social organisation.

== Ethical theories associated with naturalism ==
- Altruism
- Consequentialism
- Consequentialist libertarianism
- Cornell realism
- Ethical egoism
- Evolutionary ethics
- Hedonism
- Humanistic ethics
- Natural law
- Natural-rights libertarianism
- Objectivism
- Utilitarianism
- Virtue ethics

== Criticisms ==
Moore's open-question argument and his discussion of the naturalistic fallacy remain among the most influential critiques of ethical naturalism. Moore argued that for any proposed naturalistic definition of “good”, it remains meaningful to ask whether the natural property in question is itself good, suggesting that moral properties cannot be analytically reduced to natural properties.

R. M. Hare argued that moral language functions prescriptively rather than descriptively and therefore cannot be reduced to purely descriptive natural properties.

=== Moral nihilism ===
Some critics approach the debate from the perspective of moral nihilism, a form of moral anti-realism that denies the existence of objective moral facts or values. From this perspective, both naturalist and non-naturalist forms of moral realism are rejected. Critics in this tradition argue that attempts to ground morality in natural facts fail because there are no moral facts to explain in the first place.

== Morality as a science ==
Research in fields such as evolutionary biology, psychology, and neuroscience has examined the origins and functions of moral behaviour and the natural bases of moral judgment.

Some philosophers and scientists, such as Sam Harris, have argued that moral questions can in principle be studied scientifically in terms of the well-being or flourishing of conscious creatures.

Physicist Sean M. Carroll has criticized this approach, arguing that attempts to frame morality as a scientific discipline risk extending scientific explanation beyond its appropriate domain.

Primatologist Frans de Waal has argued against an anthropocentric view of morality, and in favor of treating ethological studies as valid evidence that prosocial behavior in humans has a common origin with that in other primates.

Philosopher John Shook has also discussed the prospects for a scientific study of morality, arguing that empirical research may contribute to ethical inquiry even if philosophical disagreements about moral facts remain unresolved.

== See also ==
- Moral realism
- Moral anti-realism
- Ethical non-naturalism
- Metaethics
- Is-ought problem
- Fact–value distinction

== Sources ==
- Garner, Richard T.; Rosen, Bernard (1967). Moral Philosophy: A Systematic Introduction to Normative Ethics and Meta-ethics. New York: Macmillan. OCLC 362952.
- Hare, R. M. (1952). The Language of Morals. Oxford University Press.
- Railton, Peter (2003). Facts, Values, and Norms. Cambridge University Press.
- Sayre-McCord, Geoffrey, ed. (1988). Essays on Moral Realism. Cornell University Press.
