= Naturalistic fallacy =

Purported fallacy in explaining good reductively

In metaethics, the naturalistic fallacy is the claim that it is possible to define good in terms of merely described entities, properties, or processes such as pleasant, desirable, or fitness. The term was introduced by British philosopher G. E. Moore in his 1903 book Principia Ethica.

Moore's naturalistic fallacy is closely related to the is–ought problem, which comes from David Hume's Treatise of Human Nature (1738–40); however, unlike Hume's view of the is–ought problem, Moore (and other proponents of ethical non-naturalism) did not consider the naturalistic fallacy to be at odds with moral realism.

== Common uses ==
=== The is–ought problem ===
The term naturalistic fallacy is sometimes used to label the problematic inference of an ought from an is (the is–ought problem). Michael Ridge relevantly elaborates that "[t]he intuitive idea is that evaluative conclusions require at least one evaluative premise—purely factual premises about the naturalistic features of things do not entail or even support evaluative conclusions." This problematic inference usually takes the form of saying that if people generally do something (e.g., eat three times a day, smoke cigarettes, dress warmly in cold weather), then people ought to do that thing. The naturalistic fallacy occurs when the is–ought inference ("People eat three times a day, so it is morally good for people to eat three times a day") is justified by the claim that whatever practice exists is a natural one ("because eating three times a day is pleasant and desirable").

Bentham, in discussing the relations of law and morality, found that when people discuss problems and issues they talk about how they wish it would be, instead of how it actually is. This can be seen in discussions of natural law and positive law. Bentham criticized natural law theory because in his view it was an instance of the naturalistic fallacy, claiming that it described how things are rather than how they ought to be.

=== Moore's discussion ===
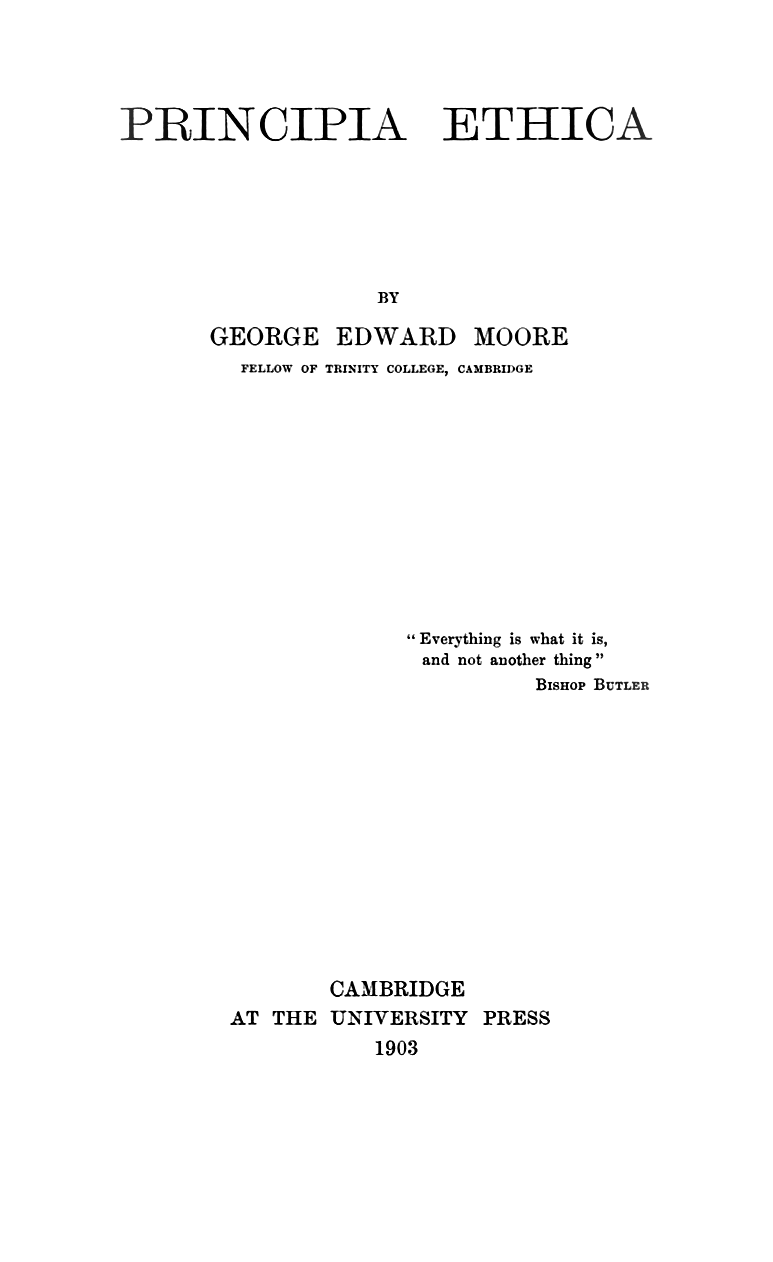
The title page of Principia Ethica

According to G. E. Moore's Principia Ethica, when philosophers try to define good reductively, in terms of natural properties like pleasant or desirable, they are committing the naturalistic fallacy:

... the assumption that because some quality or combination of qualities invariably and necessarily accompanies the quality of goodness, or is invariably and necessarily accompanied by it, or both, this quality or combination of qualities is identical with goodness. If, for example, it is believed that whatever is pleasant is and must be good, or that whatever is good is and must be pleasant, or both, it is committing the naturalistic fallacy to infer from this that goodness and pleasantness are one and the same quality. The naturalistic fallacy is the assumption that because the words 'good' and, say, 'pleasant' necessarily describe the same objects, they must attribute the same quality to them.

— Arthur N. Prior, Logic And The Basis Of Ethics

In defense of ethical non-naturalism against ethical naturalism, Moore's argument is concerned with the semantic and metaphysical underpinnings of ethics. Moore argues that good, in the sense of intrinsic value, is simply ineffable. It cannot be defined because it is not reducible to other properties, being "one of those innumerable objects of thought which are themselves incapable of definition, because they are the ultimate terms by reference to which whatever 'is' capable of definition must be defined". On the other hand, ethical naturalists eschew such principles in favor of a more empirically accessible analysis of what it means to be good: for example, in terms of pleasure in the context of hedonism.

That "pleased" does not mean "having the sensation of red", or anything else whatever, does not prevent us from understanding what it does mean. It is enough for us to know that "pleased" does mean "having the sensation of pleasure", and though pleasure is absolutely indefinable, though pleasure is pleasure and nothing else whatever, yet we feel no difficulty in saying that we are pleased. The reason is, of course, that when I say "I am pleased", I do not mean that "I" am the same thing as "having pleasure". And similarly no difficulty need be found in my saying that "pleasure is good" and yet not meaning that "pleasure" is the same thing as "good", that pleasure means good, and that good means pleasure. If I were to imagine that when I said "I am pleased", I meant that I was exactly the same thing as "pleased", I should not indeed call that a naturalistic fallacy, although it would be the same fallacy as I have called naturalistic with reference to Ethics.

— G. E. Moore, Principia Ethica § 12

In §7, Moore argues that a property is either a complex of simple properties, or else it is irreducibly simple. Complex properties can be defined in terms of their constituent parts but a simple property lacks parts. In addition to good and pleasure, Moore suggests that colour qualia are undefined: if one wants to understand yellow, one must see examples of it. It will do no good to read the dictionary and learn that yellow names the colour of egg yolks and ripe lemons, or that yellow names the primary colour between green and orange on the spectrum, or that the perception of yellow is stimulated by electromagnetic radiation with a wavelength of between 570 and 590 nanometers, because yellow is all that and more, by the open question argument.

=== Appeal to nature ===
Some people use the phrase, naturalistic fallacy or appeal to nature, in a different sense, to characterize inferences of the form "Something is natural; therefore, it is morally acceptable" or "This property is unnatural; therefore, this property is undesirable." Such inferences are common in discussions of medicine, homosexuality, environmentalism, and veganism.

The naturalistic fallacy is the idea that what is found in nature is good. It was the basis for social Darwinism, the belief that helping the poor and sick would get in the way of evolution, which depends on the survival of the fittest. Today, biologists denounce the naturalistic fallacy because they want to describe the natural world honestly, without people deriving morals about how we ought to behave (as in: If birds and beasts engage in adultery, infanticide, cannibalism, it must be OK).

— Steven Pinker

== Criticism ==
Bernard Williams called Moore's use of the term naturalistic fallacy a "spectacular misnomer", the matter in question being metaphysical, as opposed to rational.

Some philosophers reject the naturalistic fallacy or suggest solutions for the proposed is–ought problem.

=== Bound-up functions ===
Ralph McInerny suggests that ought is already bound up in is, insofar as the very nature of things have ends/goals within them. For example, a clock is a device used to keep time. When one understands the function of a clock, then a standard of evaluation is implicit in the very description of the clock, i.e., because it is a clock, it ought to keep the time. Thus, if one cannot pick a good clock from a bad clock, then one does not really know what a clock is. In like manner, if one cannot determine good human action from bad, then one does not really know what the human person is.

=== Irrationality of anti-naturalistic fallacy ===
The belief that naturalistic fallacy is inherently flawed has been criticized as lacking rational bases, and labelled anti-naturalistic fallacy. For instance, Alex Walter wrote:

"The naturalistic fallacy and Hume's 'law' are frequently appealed to for the purpose of drawing limits around the scope of scientific inquiry into ethics and morality. These two objections are shown to be without force."

That is because said beliefs implicitly assert that there is no connection between the facts and the norms (in particular, between the facts and the mental process that led to adoption of the norms). However, some philosophers argue that these connections are inevitable.

A very basic example is that if people view rescuing people as morally correct, this would shape their beliefs on what constitutes danger and what situations warrant intervention. For wider-ranging examples, if one believes that a certain ethnic group of humans have a population-level statistical hereditary predisposition to destroy civilization while the other person does not believe that such is the case, that difference in beliefs about factual matters will make the first person conclude that persecution of said ethnic group is an excusable "necessary evil" while the second person will conclude that it is a totally unjustifiable evil.

Similarly, if two people think it is evil to keep people working extremely hard in extreme poverty, they will draw different conclusions on de facto rights (as opposed to purely semantic rights) of property owners. The latter is dependent on whether they believe property owners are responsible for the aforementioned exploitation. One who accepts this premise would conclude that it is necessary to persecute property owners to mitigate exploitation. The one who does not, on the other hand, would conclude that the persecution is unnecessary and evil.

=== Non-synonymous properties ===
In 1939, William Frankena critiqued G. E. Moore's conception of the naturalistic fallacy, claiming the concept was an instance of a definist fallacy. Frankena stated that, in arguing that good cannot be defined by natural properties, Moore was trying to avoid a broader confusion caused by attempting to define a term using non-synonymous properties.

Frankena also argued that naturalistic fallacy is a complete misnomer because it is neither limited to naturalistic properties nor necessarily a fallacy. On the first word (naturalistic), he noted that Moore rejected defining good in non-natural as well as natural terms. Frankena rejected the idea that the second word (fallacy) represented an error in reasoning – a fallacy as it is usually recognized – rather than an error in semantics.

In Moore's open-question argument, because questions such as "Is that which is pleasurable good?" have no definitive answer, then pleasurable is not synonymous with good. Frankena rejected this argument as: the fact that there is always an open question merely reflects the fact that it makes sense to ask whether two things that may be identical in fact are. Thus, even if good were identical to pleasurable, it makes sense to ask whether it is; the answer may be "yes", but the question was legitimate. This seems to contradict Moore's view which accepts that sometimes alternative answers could be dismissed without argument; however, Frankena objects that this would be committing the fallacy of begging the question.

== See also ==
- Appeal to nature
- Appeal to novelty
- Appeal to tradition
- Moralistic fallacy
- Evidence-based medicine
- Evolution of morality
- Fact–value distinction
- Is-Ought Problem
- Metaethics
- Philosophical naturalism
- Norm (philosophy)
- Open-question argument
- Principia Ethica
- The Right and the Good
- Value theory
