= Richard Boyd =

American philosopher (1942–2021)

- Richard Boyd
- Born: Richard Newell Boyd; May 19, 1942; Washington, D.C., U.S.
- Died: February 20, 2021 (aged 78); Cleveland, Ohio, U.S.
- Spouse: Barbara Koslowski

Education
- Education: MIT
- Thesis: A Recursion-Theoretic Characterization of the Ramified Analytical Hierarchy (1970)
- Doctoral advisor: Richard Cartwright

Philosophical work
- Era: Contemporary philosophy
- Region: Western philosophy
- School: Analytic; Scientific realism Cornell realism Naturalism
- Institutions: Cornell University
- Doctoral students: Paul Horwich, J. D. Trout
- Main interests: Philosophy of science, philosophy of mind, ethics
- Notable ideas: Causal theory of reference-fixing for theoretical terms, definition of biological natural kinds as homeostatic property clusters, naturalistic forms of moral realism

Richard Newell Boyd (May 19, 1942 – February 20, 2021) was an American philosopher, who spent most of his career teaching philosophy at Cornell University where he was Susan Linn Sage Professor of Philosophy and Humane Letters. He specialized in epistemology, the philosophy of science, language, and mind.

== Education and career ==
Boyd became interested in the philosophy of science during his undergraduate studies for a mathematics major at MIT for which he was awarded an S.B. in 1963. He then, at the same institution and under the directorship of Richard Cartwright, went on to earn his Ph.D in 1970 with a doctoral thesis on mathematical logic titled A Recursion-Theoretic Characterization of the Ramified Analytical Hierarchy. (He would also co-author, with Gustav Hensel and Hilary Putnam, a 1969 paper by this title).

After teaching at Harvard University, the University of Michigan, Ann Arbor, and the University of California, Berkeley, Boyd taught, from 1972, at the Sage School of Philosophy at Cornell University. In 1981 he was appointed as the Susan Linn Sage Professor of Philosophy there, a position he retained until his retirement, as professor emeritus, in 2017.

Boyd held visiting positions at Claremont-McKenna College (2012), the University of Canterbury in Christchurch, New Zealand (2016), and the University of Melbourne in Melbourne, Victoria, Australia. And, after his retirement from Cornell, he also taught at Lewis & Clark College.

== Philosophical work ==
Boyd was best known for his arguments in favor of scientific realism and moral realism.

In the case of scientific realism, Boyd was a defender of what is called "the miracle argument" according to which if successful scientific theories "were far from the truth...the fact that they are so successful would be miraculous. And given the choice between a straightforward explanation of success and a miraculous explanation, clearly one should prefer the non-miraculous explanation, viz. that our best theories are approximately true."

In the case of moral realism, he was a key figure in the meta-ethical school known as "Cornell realism." On this view, a moral property like "goodness is a complex natural property that is not directly observable, but nonetheless has a robust causal profile.... 'Goodness' is not synonymous with any simpler set of more directly observable claims. Instead, 'goodness' describes the functionally complex natural property that is the effect of certain characteristic causes, and the cause of certain characteristic effects."

Boyd, along with Hilary Putnam and Jerry Fodor, was also influential in the development of an anti-reductionist form of materialism in the philosophy of mind. In this view, although all individual psychological states and processes are entirely constituted by physical entities, the "explanations, natural kinds, and properties in psychology do not reduce to counterparts in more basic sciences, such as neurophysiology or physics."

== Select works ==
More complete publication details at Boyd's PhilPapers listing, copies of further papers at his homepage's Selected Publications

=== Select papers and book chapters ===
- "Determinism, laws, and predictability in principle". Philosophy of Science. 39 (4): 431–450. 1972. doi:10.1086/288466. ISSN 0031-8248. JSTOR 186328.
- "Scientific realism and naturalistic epistemology". PSA: Proceedings of the Biennial Meeting of the Philosophy of Science Association. 80 (2): 613–662. 1980. doi:10.1086/psaprocbienmeetp.1980.2.192615. ISSN 0270-8647. JSTOR 192615.
- "On the current status of the issue of scientific realism" (PDF). Erkenntnis. 19 (1). Dordrecht: D. Reidel: 45–90. May 1983. doi:10.1007/BF00174775. ISSN 0165-0106. JSTOR 20010835.
- "What Materialism Does Not Imply," in Readings in the Philosophy of Psychology Volume I, ed. N.J. Block (1981).
- "Observations, Explanatory Power and Simplicity," in Experiment and Observation in Modern Science, ed. Achinstein and Hannaway (1984).
- "Lex Orandi est Lex Credendi," in Images of Science: Scientific Realism Versus Constructive Empiricism, ed. Churchland and Hooker (1984).
- "The Logician's Dilemma: Deductive Logic, Inductive Inference and Logical Empiricism," Erkenntnis (1985). JSTOR 20011956
- "How to be a Moral Realist," in Essays on Moral Realism, ed. Sayre McCord (1988).
- "Constructivism, Realism, and Philosophical Method," in J. Earman, ed. Inference, Explanation, and Other Philosophical Frustrations. University of California Press (1992).
- "Metaphor and Theory Change," in Metaphor and Thought, ed. Ortony (1993)

=== Edited books ===
Boyd, Richard; Gasper, Philip; Trout, J. D. (1991). The Philosophy of Science. MIT Press. ISBN 978-0-262-52156-7.

== See also ==
- American philosophy
- List of American philosophers
