= Principia Ethica =

1903 book by G. E. Moore

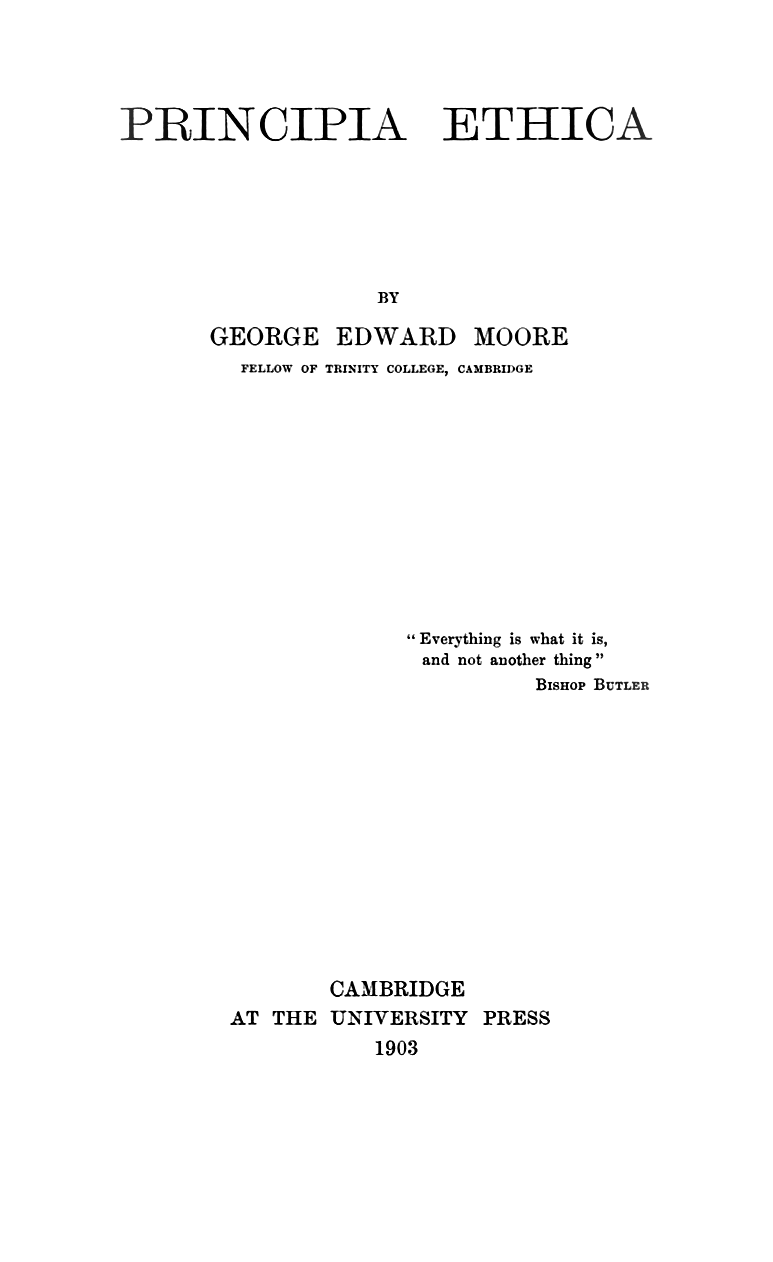
- Author: G. E. Moore
- Publisher: Cambridge University Press
- Publication date: October 1903

Principia Ethica is a book written in 1903 by British philosopher G. E. Moore. Moore questions a fundamental pillar of ethics, specifically what the definition of "good" is. He concludes that "good" is indefinable because any attempts to do so commit the naturalistic fallacy. Principia Ethica was influential, with Moore's arguments being considered ground-breaking advances in the field of moral philosophy.

== Publication history ==
Principia Ethica was first published in October 1903 by Cambridge University Press. It was reprinted in 1922 and 1929. An Italian translation by Gianni Vattimo, with a preface by Nicola Abbagnano, was published by Bompiani in 1964.

== Summary ==
Moore suggests that ethics is about three basic questions: (1) "What is good?" (which is noted as the most important of the three), (2) "What things are good or bad in themselves?", and (3) "What is good as a means?".

=== What is good? ===
The first question is concerned with the nature and definition of the term "good". Moore insists that this term is simple and indefinable. But two forms of goodness have to be distinguished: things that are good in themselves or intrinsically good and things that are good as causal means to other things. Our knowledge of value in itself comes from self-evident intuitions and is not inferred from other things, unlike our knowledge of goodness as a means or of duties. Among the things that are good in themselves, there is an important difference between the value of a whole and the values of its parts. It is often assumed that the value of a whole just consists in the sum of the values of its parts. Moore rejects this view and insists that it fails for certain types of wholes: "organic unities" or "organic wholes". Cases of retributive justice are examples of organic wholes. Such cases are wholes comprising two negative things, a morally vicious person and pain inflicted on this person as punishment. But the value on the whole is less negative (or maybe even positive) than the sum of the values of the two parts. Again we have to depend on our intuitions to determine how the intrinsic value of a whole differs from the sum of the values of its parts.

=== What things are good or bad in themselves? ===
The second question of ethics asks about what kinds of things are good in themselves. Moore discusses various traditional answers to this question, especially naturalism, which he contrasts with his own approach. The main problem with naturalism in ethics is its tendency to identify value with natural properties, like pleasure in hedonism or being more evolved in "Evolutionistic Ethics". He accuses such positions of committing the naturalistic fallacy in trying to define the term "good", an unanalysable term according to Moore, in terms of natural properties. If such definitions were true, then they would be uninformative tautologies, "'Pleasure is good' would be equivalent to 'pleasure is pleasure.'" But Moore argues, it is not a tautology but an open question whether such sentences are true. This is why the definition above and naturalism with it fails.

Moore agrees with hedonism that pleasure is good in itself, but it is not the only intrinsically valuable thing. Another important good that is valuable in itself is beauty, for example, the beauty of mountains, rivers and sunsets. Moore proposes a thought experiment, the "method of isolation", as a test to determine whether something has intrinsic value. The test is meant to remove any considerations of the thing being good as a means by isolating the intrinsic values. The method consists in imagining a world that contains only the thing in question, for example, a world composed only of a beautiful landscape. Moore argues that such a world would be better than an ugly world, even though no one is there to enjoy it in either case, which is to show that pleasure is not the only thing good in itself.

=== What is good as a means? ===
Having answered the second question of ethics, Moore proceeds to the third question: "What is good as a means?". This question is of particular relevance since it includes the domain traditionally associated with ethics: "What ought we to do?". For this it is necessary to further limit the third question since the main interest is in "actions which it is possible for most men to perform, if only they will them; and with regard to these, it does not ask merely, which among them will have some good or bad result, but which, among all the actions possible to volition at any moment, will produce the best total result". So right acts are those producing the most good. The difficulty with this is that the consequences of most actions are too vast for us to properly take into account, especially the long-term consequences. Because of this, Moore suggests that the definition of duty is limited to what generally produces better results than probable alternatives in a comparatively near future. As the reference to causal means suggests, a detailed empirical investigation into the consequences of actions is necessary to determine what our duties are, it is not accessible to self-evident intuitive insight. Whether a given rule of action turns out to be a duty depends to some extent on the conditions of the corresponding society but duties agree mostly with what common-sense recommends. Virtues, like honesty, can in turn be defined as permanent dispositions to perform duties.

== Reception ==
Principia Ethica was influential. Clive Bell considered that through his opposition to Spencer and Mill, Moore had freed his generation from utilitarianism. Principia Ethica was the bible of the Bloomsbury Group, and the philosophical foundation of their aesthetic values. Leonard Woolf considered that it offered a way of continuing living in a meaningless world. Moore's aesthetic idea of the organic whole provided artistic guidance for modernists like Virginia Woolf, and informed Bell's aesthetics.

Moore's ethical intuitionism has been seen as opening the road for noncognitive views of morality, such as emotivism.

In A Theory of Justice (1971), John Rawls compares Moore's views to those of Hastings Rashdall in his The Theory of Good and Evil (1907). Moore's views have also been compared to those of Franz Brentano, Max Scheler, and Nicolai Hartmann.

Principia Ethica has been seen by Geoffrey Warnock as less impressive and durable than Moore's contributions in fields outside ethics. John Maynard Keynes, an early devotee of Principia Ethica, would in his 1938 paper 'My Early Beliefs' repudiate as utopian Moore's underlying belief in human reasonableness and decency.

== Works cited ==
- Baldwin, Thomas, ed. (1993). Principia Ethica. Cambridge University Press. ISBN 0-521-44378-4. OCLC 27339088.
- Baldwin, Thomas (1998). "Moore, George Edward". In Craig, Edward (ed.). Routledge Encyclopedia of Philosophy. Vol. 6. Routledge. ISBN 0415-07310-3.
- Bates, Stanley (24 February 2003). "Stanley Cavell and Ethics". In Eldridge, Richard (ed.). Stanley Cavell. Cambridge University Press. pp. 15–47. doi:10.1017/cbo9780511613944.003. ISBN 978-0-521-77025-5.
- Bosanquet, Bernard (1904). "Review of Principia Ethica". Mind. 13 (50): 254–261. doi:10.1093/mind/XIII.1.254. ISSN 0026-4423. JSTOR 2248287.
- Briggs, Julia (14 June 2006). "Reading People, Reading Texts: 'Byron and Mr Briggs'". Reading Virginia Woolf. Edinburgh University Press. pp. 63–77. doi:10.3366/edinburgh/9780748624348.003.0005. ISBN 978-0-7486-2434-8.
- Bywater, William G. (1975). Clive Bell's Eye. Wayne State University Press. ISBN 0-8143-1534-8. OCLC 1093692.
- Dean, J. T. (April 1996). "Clive Bell and G. E. Moore: The Good of Art". British Journal of Aesthetics. 36 (2): 135–145. doi:10.1093/bjaesthetics/36.2.135. ISSN 0007-0904.
- Gargani, Aldo G. (1966). "Review of Principia Ethica". Belfagor (in Italian). 21 (3): 352–357. ISSN 0005-8351. JSTOR 26141788.
- Hurka, Thomas (2015). "Moore's Moral Philosophy". Stanford Encyclopedia of Philosophy. Metaphysics Research Lab, Stanford University.
- Lee, Hermione (1999). Virginia Woolf. Vintage Books. ISBN 0-375-70136-2. OCLC 42488009.
- Moore, George Edward (1903). Principia Ethica. Project Gutenberg.
- Rawls, John (1971). A Theory of Justice. Harvard University Press. ISBN 978-0-674-04260-5. OCLC 441343524.
- Schilpp, Paul Arthur, ed. (1952). The Philosophy of G. E. Moore. Tudor Publishing Company. OCLC 1150949106.
- Schneewind, J. B. (1997). "Modern Moral Philosophy". In Singer, Peter (ed.). A Companion to Ethics. Blackwell. ISBN 0-631-18785-5.
- Stratton-Lake, Philip (2014). "Principia Ethica". In Shand, John (ed.). Central Works of Philosophy. Vol. 4. Routledge. doi:10.4324/9781315710389. ISBN 978-1-315-47893-7. OCLC 1258257960.
- Sylvester, Robert Peter (1990). The Moral Philosophy of G. E. Moore. Temple University Press. ISBN 978-1-4399-0169-4. OCLC 472409433.
- Warnock, Mary (1978). Ethics Since 1900 (3d ed.). Oxford University Press. ISBN 0-19-289108-1. OCLC 3813097.
- Warnock, Geoffrey (1995). "Moore, George Edward". In Honderich, Ted (ed.). The Oxford Companion to Philosophy. Oxford: Oxford University Press. p. 585. ISBN 0-19-866132-0.
