= G. E. Moore =

English philosopher (1873–1958)

G. E. Moore OM FBA
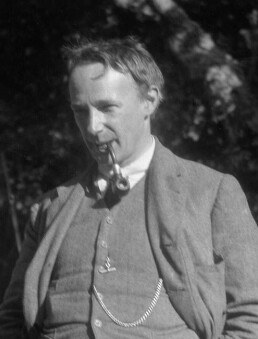
- Moore in 1914
- Born: George Edward Moore; 4 November 1873; Upper Norwood, London, England
- Died: 24 October 1958 (aged 84); Cambridge, England
- Resting place: Ascension Parish Burial Ground, Cambridge
- Spouse: Dorothy Mildred Ely (m. 1916)
- Children: 2, including Nicholas Moore
- Relatives: George Moore (grandfather); Thomas Sturge Moore (brother)

Education
- Education: Trinity College, Cambridge (BA, 1896)
- Academic advisors: J. M. E. McTaggart; James Ward

Philosophical work
- Era: 19th-/20th-century philosophy
- Region: Western philosophy
- School: Analytic philosophy; Consequentialism
- Institutions: Trinity College, Cambridge; Aristotelian Society (president, 1918–19); Ethical Union (president, 1935–36)
- Doctoral students: Alice Ambrose; Casimir Lewy; Rush Rhees
- Notable students: R. B. Braithwaite; Morris Lazerowitz; C. A. Mace; Norman Malcolm; C. L. Stevenson
- Main interests: Ethics; Epistemology; Metaphysics
- Notable ideas: Common-sense convictions; Naturalistic fallacy; Moore's paradox; Paradox of analysis; Open-question argument; External and internal relations; "Here is one hand" (Moorean shift); Transparency of experience

George Edward Moore (4 November 1873 – 24 October 1958) was an English philosopher who, alongside Bertrand Russell, Ludwig Wittgenstein and earlier Gottlob Frege, was an initiator of analytic philosophy. He and Russell began de-emphasising the idealism which was then prevalent among British philosophers and became known for advocating common-sense concepts and contributing to ethics, epistemology and metaphysics. He was said to have had an "exceptional personality and moral character". Ray Monk dubbed him "the most revered philosopher of his era".

As Professor of Philosophy at the University of Cambridge, he influenced but abstained from the Bloomsbury Group, an informal set of intellectuals. He edited the journal Mind. He was a member of the Cambridge Apostles from 1894 to 1901, a fellow of the British Academy from 1918, and was chairman of the Cambridge University Moral Sciences Club in 1912–1944. A humanist, he presided over the British Ethical Union (now Humanists UK) in 1935–1936.

== Biography ==
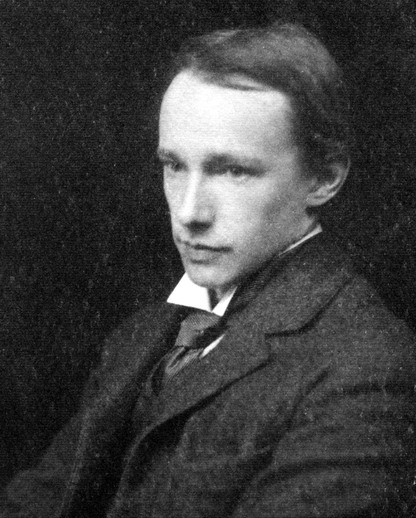
Moore, c. 1903

=== Early life and education ===
George Edward Moore was born in Upper Norwood, in south-east London, on 4 November 1873, the middle child of seven of Daniel Moore, a medical doctor, and Henrietta Sturge. His grandfather was the physician, writer and British Israelite George Moore. His eldest brother was Thomas Sturge Moore, a poet, writer and engraver.

He was educated at Dulwich College and, in 1892, began attending Trinity College, Cambridge, to learn classics and moral sciences. His tripos results were a double first.

=== Career ===
He became a Fellow of Trinity in 1898 and was later University of Cambridge Professor of Mental Philosophy and Logic from 1925 to 1939.

Moore is known best now for defending ethical non-naturalism, his emphasis on common sense for philosophical method, and the paradox that bears his name. He was admired by and influenced by other philosophers and some of the Bloomsbury Group. But unlike his colleague and admirer Bertrand Russell, who for some years thought Moore fulfilled his "ideal of genius", he is mostly unknown presently except among academic philosophers. Moore's essays are known for their clarity and circumspection of writing style and methodical and patient treatment of philosophical problems. He was critical of modern philosophy for lack of progress, which he saw as a stark contrast to the dramatic advances in the natural sciences since the Renaissance. Among Moore's most famous works are his Principia Ethica, and his essays, "The Refutation of Idealism", "A Defence of Common Sense", and "A Proof of the External World".

Moore was an important and admired member of the secretive Cambridge Apostles, a discussion group drawn from the British intellectual elite. At the time, another member, 22-year-old Bertrand Russell, wrote "I almost worship him as if he were a god. I have never felt such an extravagant admiration for anybody", and would later write that "for some years he fulfilled my ideal of genius. He was in those days beautiful and slim, with a look almost of inspiration as deeply passionate as Spinoza's."

In 1914 Moore traveled to Norway to visit Wittgenstein, here he took a series of notes later published as Notes dictated to G. E. Moore in Norway. From 1918 to 1919, Moore was chairman of the Aristotelian Society, a group committed to the systematic study of philosophy, its historical development and its methods and problems. He was appointed to the Order of Merit in 1951. This was awarded to him at Buckingham Palace by King George VI. After a conversation with the King, he returned to his wife who was awaiting Moore back in the car and told her "Do you know that the King had never heard of Wittgenstein!". The title of Ludwig Wittgenstein's Tractatus Logico-Philosophicus was adopted at the suggestion of Moore, taking the title from Baruch Spinoza's Tractatus Theologico-Politicus (1670).

=== Death ===
Moore died in England in the Evelyn Nursing Home on 24 October 1958. He was cremated at Cambridge Crematorium on 28 October 1958 and his ashes interred at the Parish of the Ascension Burial Ground in the city. His wife, Dorothy Ely (1892–1977), was buried there. Together, they had two sons, the poet Nicholas Moore and the composer Timothy Moore.

== Philosophy ==
=== Ethics ===
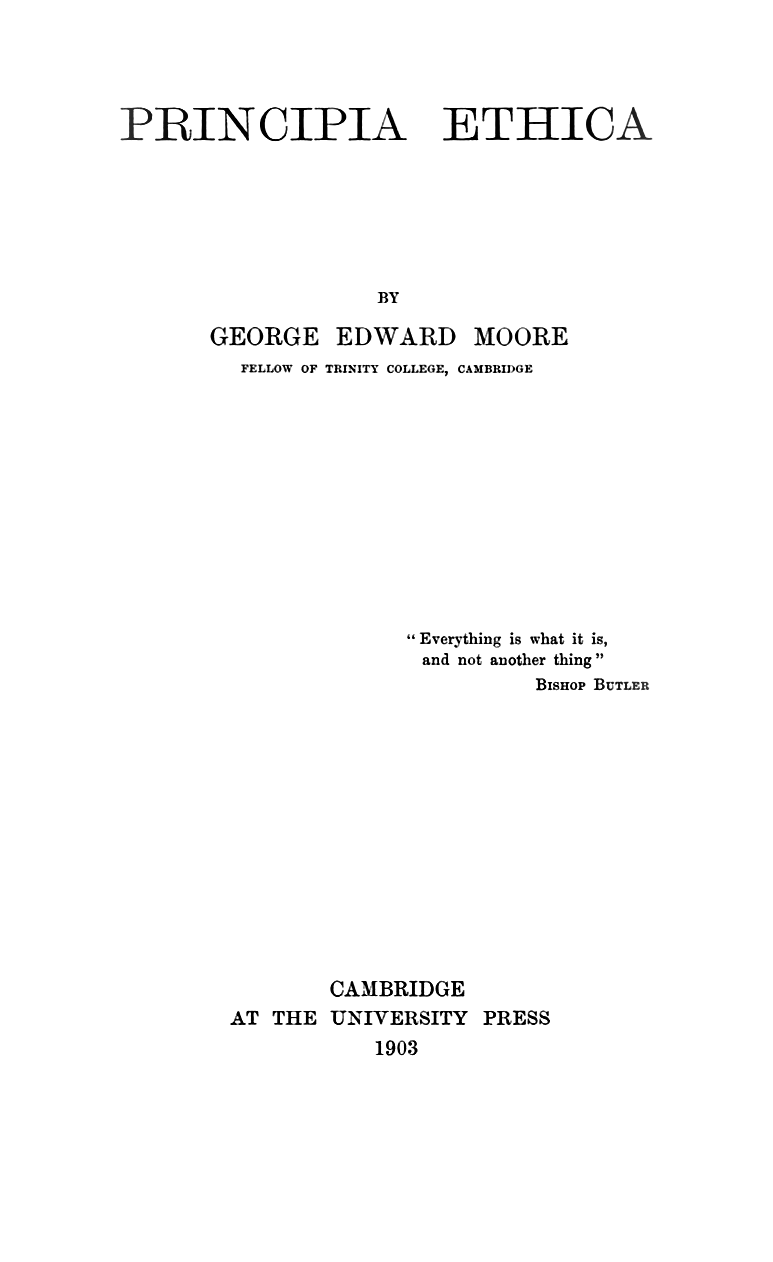
The title page of Principia Ethica

His influential work Principia Ethica is one of the main inspirations of the reaction against ethical naturalism (see ethical non-naturalism) and is partly responsible for the twentieth-century concern with metaethics.

==== Naturalistic fallacy ====
Moore asserted that philosophical arguments can suffer from a confusion between the use of a term in a particular argument and the definition of that term (in all arguments). He named this confusion the naturalistic fallacy. For example, an ethical argument may claim that if an item has certain properties, then that item is 'good.' A hedonist may argue that 'pleasant' items are 'good' items. Other theorists may argue that 'complex' things are 'good' things. Moore contends that, even if such arguments are correct, they do not provide definitions for the term 'good'. The property of 'goodness' cannot be defined. It can only be shown and grasped. Any attempt to define it (X is good if it has property Y) will simply shift the problem (Why is Y-ness good in the first place?).

==== Open-question argument ====
Moore's argument for the indefinability of 'good' (and thus for the fallaciousness in the "naturalistic fallacy") is often termed the open-question argument; it is presented in §13 of Principia Ethica. The argument concerns the nature of statements such as "Anything that is pleasant is also good" and the possibility of asking questions such as "Is it good that x is pleasant?". According to Moore, these questions are open and these statements are significant; and they will remain so no matter what is substituted for "pleasure". Moore concludes from this that any analysis of value is bound to fail. In other words, if value could be analysed, then such questions and statements would be trivial and obvious. Since they are anything but trivial and obvious, value must be indefinable.

Critics of Moore's arguments sometimes claim that he is appealing to general puzzles concerning analysis (cf. the paradox of analysis), rather than revealing anything special about value. The argument clearly depends on the assumption that if 'good' were definable, it would be an analytic truth about 'good', an assumption that many contemporary moral realists like Richard Boyd and Peter Railton reject. Other responses appeal to the Fregean distinction between sense and reference, allowing that value concepts are special and sui generis, but insisting that value properties are nothing but natural properties (this strategy is similar to that taken by non-reductive materialists in philosophy of mind).

==== Good as indefinable ====
Moore contended that goodness cannot be analysed in terms of any other property. In Principia Ethica, he writes:

It may be true that all things which are good are also something else, just as it is true that all things which are yellow produce a certain kind of vibration in the light. And it is a fact, that Ethics aims at discovering what are those other properties belonging to all things which are good. But far too many philosophers have thought that when they named those other properties they were actually defining good; that these properties, in fact, were simply not "other," but absolutely and entirely the same with goodness. (Principia, § 10 ¶ 3)

Therefore, we cannot define 'good' by explaining it in other words. We can only indicate a thing or an action and say "That is good." Similarly, we cannot describe to a person born totally blind exactly what yellow is. We can only show a sighted person a piece of yellow paper or a yellow scrap of cloth and say "That is yellow."

==== Good as a non-natural property ====
In addition to categorising 'good' as indefinable, Moore also emphasised that it is a non-natural property. This means that it cannot be empirically or scientifically tested or verified—it is not analysable by "natural science".

==== Moral knowledge ====
Moore argued that, once arguments based on the naturalistic fallacy had been discarded, questions of intrinsic goodness could be settled only by appeal to what he (following Sidgwick) termed "moral intuitions": self-evident propositions which recommend themselves to moral thought, but which are not susceptible to either direct proof or disproof (Principia, § 45). As a result of his opinion, he has often been described by later writers as an advocate of ethical intuitionism. Moore, however, wished to distinguish his opinions from the opinions usually described as "Intuitionist" when Principia Ethica was written:

In order to express the fact that ethical propositions of my first class [propositions about what is good as an end in itself] are incapable of proof or disproof, I have sometimes followed Sidgwick's usage in calling them 'Intuitions.' But I beg that it may be noticed that I am not an 'Intuitionist,' in the ordinary sense of the term. Sidgwick himself seems never to have been clearly aware of the immense importance of the difference which distinguishes his Intuitionism from the common doctrine, which has generally been called by that name. The Intuitionist proper is distinguished by maintaining that propositions of my second class—propositions which assert that a certain action is right or a duty—are incapable of proof or disproof by any enquiry into the results of such actions. I, on the contrary, am no less anxious to maintain that propositions of this kind are not 'Intuitions,' than to maintain that propositions of my first class are Intuitions.

— G. E. Moore, Principia Ethica, Preface ¶ 5

Moore distinguished his view from the opinion of deontological intuitionists, who claimed that "intuitions" could determine questions about what actions are right or required by duty. Moore, as a consequentialist, argued that "duties" and moral rules could be determined by investigating the effects of particular actions or kinds of actions (Principia, § 89), and so were matters for empirical investigation rather than direct objects of intuition (Principia, § 90). According to Moore, "intuitions" revealed not the rightness or wrongness of specific actions, but only what items were good in themselves, as ends to be pursued.

==== Right action, duty and virtue ====
Moore holds that right actions are those producing the most good. The difficulty with this is that the consequences of most actions are too complex for us to properly take into account, especially the long-term consequences. Because of this, Moore suggests that the definition of duty is limited to what generally produces better results than probable alternatives in a comparatively near future. Whether a given rule of action is also a duty depends to some extent on the conditions of the corresponding society but duties agree mostly with what common-sense recommends. Virtues, like honesty, can in turn be defined as permanent dispositions to perform duties.

=== Proof of an external world ===
One of the most important parts of Moore's philosophical development was his differing with the idealism that dominated British philosophy (as represented by the works of F. H. Bradley and his former teacher J. M. E. McTaggart), and his defence of what he regarded as a "common sense" type of realism. In his 1925 essay "A Defence of Common Sense", he argued against idealism and scepticism toward the external world, on the grounds that they could not give reasons to accept that their metaphysical premises were more plausible than the reasons we have for accepting the common sense claims about our knowledge of the world, which sceptics and idealists must deny. He famously put the point into dramatic relief with his 1939 essay "Proof of an External World", in which he gave a common sense argument against scepticism by raising his right hand and saying "Here is one hand" and then raising his left and saying "And here is another", then concluding that there are at least two external objects in the world, and therefore that he knows (by this argument) that an external world exists. Not surprisingly, not everyone preferring sceptical doubts found Moore's method of argument entirely convincing; Moore, however, defends his argument on the grounds that sceptical arguments seem invariably to require an appeal to "philosophical intuitions" that we have considerably less reason to accept than we have for the common sense claims that they supposedly refute. The "Here is one hand" argument also influenced Ludwig Wittgenstein, who spent his last years working out a new method for Moore's argument in the remarks that were published posthumously as On Certainty.)

=== Moore's paradox ===
Moore is also remembered for drawing attention to the peculiar inconsistency involved in uttering a sentence such as "It is raining, but I do not believe it is raining", a puzzle now commonly termed "Moore's paradox". The puzzle is that it seems inconsistent for anyone to assert such a sentence; but there doesn't seem to be any logical contradiction between "It is raining" and "I don't believe that it is raining", because the former is a statement about the weather and the latter a statement about a person's belief about the weather, and it is perfectly logically possible that it may rain whilst a person does not believe that it is raining.

In addition to Moore's own work on the paradox, the puzzle also inspired a great deal of work by Ludwig Wittgenstein, who described the paradox as the most impressive philosophical insight that Moore had ever introduced. It is said that when Wittgenstein first heard this paradox one evening (which Moore had earlier stated in a lecture), he rushed round to Moore's lodgings, got him out of bed and insisted that Moore repeat the entire lecture to him.

=== Organic wholes ===
Moore's description of the principle of the organic whole is extremely straightforward, nonetheless, and a variant on a pattern that began with Aristotle:

The value of a whole must not be assumed to be the same as the sum of the values of its parts (Principia, § 18).

According to Moore, a moral actor cannot survey the 'goodness' inherent in the various parts of a situation, assign a value to each of them, and then generate a sum in order to get an idea of its total value. A moral scenario is a complex assembly of parts, and its total value is often created by the relations between those parts, and not by their individual value. The organic metaphor is thus very appropriate: biological organisms seem to have emergent properties which cannot be found anywhere in their individual parts. For example, a human brain seems to exhibit a capacity for thought when none of its neurons exhibit any such capacity. In the same way, a moral scenario can have a value different than the sum of its component parts.

To understand the application of the organic principle to questions of value, it is perhaps best to consider Moore's primary example, that of a consciousness experiencing a beautiful object. To see how the principle works, a thinker engages in "reflective isolation", the act of isolating a given concept in a kind of null context and determining its intrinsic value. In our example, we can easily see that, of themselves, beautiful objects and consciousnesses are not particularly valuable things. They might have some value, but when we consider the total value of a consciousness experiencing a beautiful object, it seems to exceed the simple sum of these values. Hence the value of a whole must not be assumed to be the same as the sum of the values of its parts.

== Works ==
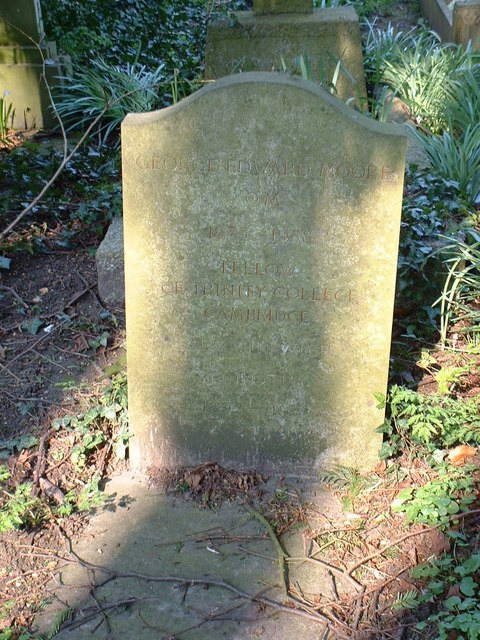
The gravestone of G. E. Moore and his wife Dorothy Moore in the Ascension Parish Burial Ground, Cambridge

- G. E. Moore, "The Nature of Judgment" (1899)
- G. E. Moore (1903). "IV.—Experience and Empiricism" (PDF). Proceedings of the Aristotelian Society. 3: 80–95. doi:10.1093/aristotelian/3.1.80.
- G. E. Moore, Principia Ethica (1903)
- G. E. Moore, "Review of Franz Brentano's The Origin of the Knowledge of Right and Wrong" (1903)
- G. E. Moore, "The Refutation of Idealism" (1903)
- G. E. Moore (1904). "VII.—Kant's Idealism". Proceedings of the Aristotelian Society. 4: 127–140. doi:10.1093/aristotelian/4.1.127.
- G. E. Moore, "The Nature and Reality of the Objects of Perception" (1905–6)
- G. E. Moore (1908). "III.—Professor James' "Pragmatism"". Proceedings of the Aristotelian Society. 8: 33–77. doi:10.1093/aristotelian/8.1.33.
- G. E. Moore (1910). "II.—The Subject-Matter of Psychology". Proceedings of the Aristotelian Society. 10: 36–62. doi:10.1093/aristotelian/10.1.36.
- G. E. Moore, Ethics (1912)
- G. E. Moore, "Some Judgments of Perception" (1918)
- G. E. Moore, Philosophical Studies (1922) [papers published 1903–21]
  - G. E. Moore, "The Conception of Intrinsic Value"
  - G. E. Moore, "The Nature of Moral Philosophy"
- G. E. Moore, "Are the Characteristics of Things Universal or Particular?" (1923)
- G. E. Moore, "A Defence of Common Sense" (1925)
- G. E. Moore and F. P. Ramsey, Facts and Proposition (Symposium) (1927)
- W. Kneale and G. E. Moore, "Symposium: Is Existence a Predicate?" (1936) JSTOR 4106413
- G. E. Moore, "An Autobiography," and "A reply to my critics," in: The Philosophy Of G. E. Moore. ed. Schilpp, Paul Arthur (1942).
- G. E. Moore, Some Main Problems of Philosophy (1953) [lectures delivered 1910–11]
  - G. E. Moore, Ch. 3, "Propositions"
- G. E. Moore, Philosophical Papers (1959)
  - G. E. Moore, Ch. 7: "Proof of an External World"
- "Margin Notes by G. E. Moore on The Works of Thomas Reid (1849: With Notes by Sir William Hamilton)" [Moore's marginalia on Thomas Reid's works].
- G. E. Moore, The Early Essays, edited by Tom Regan, Temple University Press (1986).
- G. E. Moore, The Elements of Ethics, edited and with an introduction by Tom Regan, Temple University Press (1991).

== See also ==
- The Right and the Good
