= Open-question argument =

Philosophical argument

The open-question argument is a philosophical argument put forward by British philosopher G. E. Moore in §13 of Principia Ethica (1903), to refute the equating of the property of goodness with some non-moral property, X, whether natural (e.g. pleasure) or supernatural (e.g. God's command). That is, Moore's argument attempts to show that no moral property is identical to a natural property. The argument takes the form of a modus tollens:

Premise 1: If X is good by definition, then the question "Is it true that X is good?" is meaningless.

Premise 2: The question "Is it true that X is good?" is not meaningless (i.e. it is an open question).

Conclusion: X is not (analytically equivalent to) good.

The type of question Moore refers to in this argument is an identity question, "Is it true that X is Y?" Such a question is an open question if it can be asked by a person who knows what the words mean; otherwise it is closed. For example, "I know he is a vegan, but does he eat meat?" would be a closed question. However, "I know that it is pleasurable, but is it good?" is an open question; the answer cannot be derived from the meaning of the terms alone.

The open-question argument claims that any attempt to identify morality with some set of observable, natural properties will always be liable to an open question, and if so, then moral facts cannot be reduced to natural properties and that therefore ethical naturalism is false. Put another way, Moore is saying that any definition of good in terms of a natural property will be invalid because to question it would be to ask a closed question, since the two terms mean the same thing; however, an open question can always be asked about any such attempted definition, it can always be questioned whether good is the same thing as pleasure, etc. Shortly before (in section §11), Moore had said if good is defined as pleasure, or any other natural property, "good" may be substituted for "pleasure", or that other property, anywhere where it occurs. However, "pleasure is good" is a meaningful, informative statement; but "good is good" (after making the substitution) is a mere uninformative tautology.

== Objections and rejoinders ==
=== Begging the question ===
The idea that Moore begs the question (i.e. assumes the conclusion in a premise) was first raised by William Frankena. Since analytic equivalency, for two objects X and Y, logically results in the question "Is it true that X is Y?" being meaningless (by Moore's own argument), to say that the question is meaningless is to concede analytic equivalency. Thus Moore begs the question in the second premise. He assumes that the question is a meaningful one (i.e. that it is an open question). This begs the question and the open-question argument thus fails.

In response to this, the open-question argument can be reformulated. The Darwall-Gibbard-Railton reformulation argues for the impossibility of equating a moral property with a non-moral one using the internalist theory of motivation. Goodness, on this account, is the property which ideally gives rise to certain internal states (motivations, sentiments, desires to act), but is not, itself, equivalent to those states.

The internalist, or Humean, theory of motivation (belief–desire–intention model) is the view that if one has a reason to act, one must have some desire which would be fulfilled by that act, compared to the externalist theory of motivation, which holds that we may have reasons to act absent any accompanying desire. According to internalism, moral motivation comes from the (global) benefit or utility of moral sentiments or actions. On the other hand, externalism holds that moral properties give us reasons for acting independent of desire or utility. If internalism is true, then the OQA may avoid begging the question against the naturalist by claiming that the moral properties and the motivations to act belong to different categories, and therefore, necessarily are not analytically equivalent. That is, it remains an open question whether the properties which do give rise to certain sentiments ought to guide our actions in that way. To argue for the special motivational effects of moral beliefs is to commit the fallacy of special pleading.

=== Meaningful analysis ===
The main assumption within the open-question argument can be found within premise 1. It is assumed that analytic equivalency will result in meaningless analysis. Thus, if we understand Concept C, and Concept C* can be analysed in terms of Concept C, then we should grasp concept C* by virtue of our understanding of Concept C. Yet it is obvious that such understanding of Concept C* only comes about through the analysis proper. Mathematics would be the prime example: mathematics is tautological and its claims are true by definition, yet we can develop new mathematical conceptions and theorems. Thus, X (i.e. some non-moral property) might well be analytically equivalent to the good, and still the question of "Is X good?" can be meaningful. Ergo premise 1 does not hold and the argument falls.

=== Frege sense–reference distinction ===
Sense and reference are two different aspects of some terms' meanings. A term's reference is the object to which the term refers, while the term's sense is the way that the term refers to that object.

There is a difference between the sense of a term and its reference (i.e. the object itself). Thus, we can understand a claim like "goodness is identical with pleasure" as an a posteriori identity claim similar to "Water is H_{2}O". The question "This is H_{2}O but is it water?" is intelligible and so, in that limited sense, whether or not water is H_{2}O is an open question; note that this does not address the issue of significance. But that does not lead us to conclude that water is not H_{2}O. "Water is H_{2}O" is an identity claim that is known to be true a posteriori (i.e., it was discovered via empirical investigation). Another example is "redness" being identical to certain phenomena of electromagnetism. This is discovered by empirical investigation. Similarly, many moral naturalists argue that "rightness" can be discovered as an a posteriori truth, by investigating the different claims, like that of pleasure being the good, or of duty being the good.

This is done by invoking rightness and wrongness to explain certain empirical phenomena, and then discovering a posteriori whether maximizing utility occupies the relevant explanatory role. For example, they argue that since right actions contingently have certain effects e.g. being causally responsible for a tendency towards social stability—so it follows we can fix the term "right" refer to the empirical description "the property of acts, whatever it is, that is causally responsible for their tendency towards social stability." With this description for "right," we can then investigate which acts accomplish this: e.g. those actions that maximize utility. We can then conclude that we have learned that "right" refers to "maximizing utility" through a posteriori means.

The Frege sense–reference distinction can be understood in layman's terms by using the analogy of the Masked Man. A citizen living on the frontiers of the Wild West is told by the sheriff that his brother is the Masked Man who has recently been robbing banks. The citizen protests that he understands who his brother is, and who the Masked Man is supposed to be, and can meaningfully ask, "Is my brother the Masked Man?" Obviously, analytic equivalency is of no relevance here. The matter is an empirical one, which the citizen must investigate a posteriori. The absurdity of dismissing the claim as such is apparent.

== See also ==
- Euthyphro dilemma – Ethical problem on the origin of morality posed by Socrates
- Summum bonum – Latin expression meaning the highest or ultimate good
