= 1996 in philosophy =

1996 in philosophy

== Events ==
- May - Sokal affair: American mathematical physicist Alan Sokal hoaxes the editors into publishing a deliberately nonsensical paper, "Transgressing the Boundaries: Toward a Transformative Hermeneutics of Quantum Gravity", in a "science wars" issue of the journal Social Text (Duke University Press) as a critique of the intellectual rigor of postmodernism in academic cultural studies.
- Willard Van Orman Quine is awarded the Kyoto Prize in Arts and Philosophy for his "outstanding contributions to the progress of philosophy in the 20th century by proposing numerous theories based on keen insights in logic, epistemology, philosophy of science and philosophy of language."

== Publications ==
- Between Facts and Norms
- Blackwell Companion to Philosophy
- Destiny, or The Attraction of Affinities
- Naïve. Super
- Pooh and the Philosophers
- Slovenska smer
- Robert Zubrin's The Case for Mars
- David Chalmers's The Conscious Mind
- The Global Trap
- Terry Eagleton's The Illusions of Postmodernism
- The Origins of Virtue
- The Vision of the Anointed
- Vita Brevis
- Jürgen Habermas, The Inclusion of the Other (1996)
- Richard Clyde Taylor's, Restoring Pride: The Lost Virtue of Our Age (1996)

== Deaths ==
- January 9 - Félix González-Torres (born 1957)
- January 17 - Juan Luis Segundo (born 1925)
- January 22 - Israel Eldad (born 1910)
- February 18 - Frank Sibley (born 1923)
- February 28 - Maximilien Rubel (born 1905)
- March 3 - Marguerite Duras (born 1914)
- March 12 - Archie J. Bahm (born 1907)
- March 28 - Hans Blumenberg (born 1920)
- April 2 - Jean Elizabeth Hampton (born 1954)
- April 18 - Kalim Siddiqui (born 1931)
- May 5 - Donald T. Campbell (born 1916)
- May 6 - Richard Robinson (born 1902)
- May 21 - Frederick Wilhelmsen (born 1923)
- May 22 - Timothy Leary (born 1920)
- May 27 - George Boolos (born 1940)
- June 6 - José María Valverde (born 1926)
- June 16 - Richard Sylvan (born 1935)
- June 17 - Thomas Kuhn (born 1922)
- June 18 - Branko Bošnjak (born 1923)
- July 21 - Macha Rosenthal (born 1917)
- August 4 - Intisar-ul-Haque (born 1935)
- August 6 - Gabriel Nuchelmans (born 1922)
- August 16 - Maurice Natanson (born 1924)
- September 21 - Henri Nouwen (born 1932)
- October 11 - Edith Penrose (born 1914)
- October 21 - Léon Ashkenazi (born 1922)
- October 27 - David H. M. Brooks (born 1950)
- December 9 - Raphael Samuel (born 1934)
- December 13 - Waheed Akhtar (born 1934)
- December 20 - Osvaldo Lira (born 1904)
- December 20 - Carl Sagan (born 1934)
- Abdoldjavad Falaturi (born 1926)
- Simon Soloveychik
- Ajahn Thate
- Thomas Tymoczko
- Robert Weingard
