= Veneer theory =

Theory of base morals

In moral psychology, veneer theory is a term coined by Dutch primatologist Frans de Waal to label the Hobbesian view of human morality that he criticizes throughout his work. Although he criticizes this view in earlier works, the term in this form is introduced in his 2005 book Our Inner Ape, denoting a concept that he rejects, namely that human morality is "a cultural overlay, a thin veneer hiding an otherwise selfish and brutish nature". The idea of the veneer theory goes back to Thomas Henry Huxley and has more recently been advocated by biologists like George C. Williams.

== Proponents of the theory ==
As evidenced by de Waal's characterisation of this theory as "Hobbesian", one of the earliest and most influential thinkers criticized by him for having popularized this view is Thomas Hobbes:

The traditional view is that of a contract among our ancestors, who decided to live together “by covenant only, which is artificial,” as Thomas Hobbes put it.

— Frans de Waal, Our Inner Ape

A few centuries later, Thomas Henry Huxley developed the idea that moral tendencies are not part of the human nature, and so our ancestors became moral by choice, not by evolution. Thus it represents a discrepancy in Huxley's Darwinian conviction. Social behavior is explained by this theory as a veneer of morality. This dualistic point of view separates humans from animals by rejecting every connection between human morality and animal social tendencies. George C. Williams, as another advocate of the veneer theory, sees morality as "an accidental capability produced, in its boundless stupidity, by a biological process that is normally opposed to the expression of such a capability".

Psychologist Abraham Maslow argued that humans no longer have instincts because we have the ability to override them in certain situations. He felt that what is called instinct is often imprecisely defined, and really amounts to strong drives. For Maslow, an instinct is something which cannot be overridden, and therefore while the term may have applied to humans in the past, it no longer does.

Richard Dawkins seems to condone the veneer theory when he writes:

we, alone on Earth, can rebel against the tyranny of the selfish replicators

— Richard Dawkins, The Selfish Gene

Some argue that veneer theory presents a false dichotomy; the adaptations of a cultural overlay of pseudo-morals and de Waal's biologically based morals might coexist, and might both be evolutionarily advantageous.

== Critics of the theory ==
De Waal criticizes the veneer theory and sees our morality as a direct outgrowth of the social instincts human beings share with other animals. He argues that the advocates of the veneer theory do not have any indications or empirical evidence which support the theory, and that it is highly unlikely that humans can deny their genes and improve morality merely by choice. As an example he compares Huxley's theory with a school of piranhas deciding to become vegetarian. De Waal bases his argument against the veneer theory on observations of behavior of humanity's relatives in his long work as primatologist. "Building blocks of morality" can be already observed in other primates, and by the principle of parsimony, it is quite possible that some sort of morality is evolutionarily ancient and shared with our ancestors. De Waal assumes that the evolutionary origins lie in emotions we share with other animals, e.g. empathy. Human morality is according to him a product of social evolution, and instead of Huxley's theory, this point of view, a continuity between human morality and animal social tendencies, is unitary and thus more compatible with the evolutionary theory. Other critics of the veneer theory are Edward Westermarck, E. O. Wilson and Rutger Bregman.

Psychologist Christopher Ryan and psychiatrist Cacilda Jethá also express similar concerns in their book Sex at Dawn, where they criticize what they call the "neo-Hobbesian" narrative of human nature:

Hobbes took the madness of his age, considered it “normal,” and projected it back into prehistoric epochs of which he knew next to nothing. What Hobbes called “human nature” was a projection of seventeenth-century Europe, where life for most was rough, to put it mildly. Though it has persisted for centuries, Hobbes’s dark fantasy of prehistoric human life is as valid as grand conclusions about Siberian wolves based on observations of stray dogs in Tijuana.

— Christopher Ryan, Sex at Dawn

They also cite Stephen Jay Gould as a critic of this view:

Why should our nastiness be the baggage of an apish past and our kindness uniquely human? Why should we not seek continuity with other animals for our 'noble' traits as well?

— Stephen Jay Gould

== See also ==
- Animal faith
- Evolution of morality
- Hobbes's moral and political philosophy
- Sociobiology
- Theory of mind
