= Monogamish (film) =

Documentary film from 2017

Monogamish is a 2017 American documentary film directed by Tao Ruspoli starring Dan Savage, Esther Perel and Christopher Ryan. The 75-minute film explores contemporary attitudes toward monogamy, marriage, and alternative relationship structures in American society.

== Synopsis ==
Following his divorce from actress Olivia Wilde (who is not named in the film), filmmaker Tao Ruspoli embarks on a personal journey to examine the institution of monogamy and marriage in contemporary America. The documentary features interviews with relationship experts, historians, psychologists, and ordinary couples as Ruspoli questions traditional assumptions about love, commitment, and family structures. The film takes its title from a term coined by sex columnist Dan Savage referring to relationships that are "mostly monogamous" but allow for some flexibility. Savage is one of the main voices featured in the documentary along with psychotherapist and relationship specialist, Esther Perel.

== Production ==
The documentary was written and directed by Tao Ruspoli, co-written by Mark Wrathall, a philosopher who also appeared in Ruspoli's previous documentary Being in the World (2010).

In the film, Ruspoli, who is the son of Italian aristocrat Prince Alessandro Ruspoli, 9th Prince of Cerveteri (known as "Dado"), drew upon his own family's unconventional relationship history. The documentary incorporates personal narratives from Ruspoli's family members alongside expert commentary. The film was produced by Giancarlo Canavesio, Sol Tryon, and Daniel Tibbets Guevara through Mangusta Productions.

== Featured subjects ==
The film includes interviews with several prominent figures in the fields of psychology, sexuality, and relationship counseling:

- Dan Savage – Sex columnist and author, creator of the "Savage Love" advice column and podcast, who coined the term "monogamish"
- Esther Perel – Belgian psychotherapist and author specializing in relationships and sexuality
- Christopher Ryan – Evolutionary psychologist and co-author of Sex at Dawn
- Stephanie Coontz – Historian and author specializing in marriage and family
- Mark Wrathall – Professor of Philosophy at Oxford University
- Diana Adams – Attorney and LGBTQ+ rights advocate involved in polyamory advocacy
- Princess Claudia Ruspoli – Member of the Ruspoli family and Ruspoli's cousin
- Roberta Keith (credited as Roberta Haze) – Ruspoli's neighbor and friend

== Themes and content ==
Monogamish examines the historical and cultural evolution of marriage and monogamy, questioning whether traditional pair bonding remains viable in contemporary society. The film explores various relationship models, including traditional monogamy, polyamory, open relationships,"monogamish" relationships (mostly monogamous with agreed-upon flexibility). Philosopher Mark Wrathall serves as the main voice extolling the virtues of traditional monogamous marriage, though with an existentialist twist. Wrathall draws heavily on Søren Kierkegaard in his arguments in support of monogamy.

The documentary addresses the psychological, social, and economic factors that influence relationship choices, while examining the tension between human desires for both security and novelty, a tension that features prominently in the work of Esther Perel.

== Release and distribution ==
Monogamish had its world premiere at the Rome Film Festival on October 21, 2015. The film subsequently screened at the Austin Film Festival in October 2016 before making its North American festival debut. It has a runtime of 75 minutes and was released unrated.

In 2017, Abramorama acquired the film for U.S. distribution. The film had its U.S. theatrical release on October 13, 2017, opening at the Roxy Cinema TriBeCa in New York City. The film was distributed by Cargo Film & Releasing and subsequently became available on digital platforms including Amazon Prime Video and Apple TV in early 2018.

== Critical reception ==
Monogamish received generally positive reviews from critics. On the review aggregator website Rotten Tomatoes, the film holds an approval rating of 83% based on critic reviews.

- Film Inquiry praised the documentary as "an unexpectedly robust, eye-opening take on the history, as well as the contemporary state of marriage, love, and sexuality," noting Ruspoli's "effective, non-judgmental eye" in challenging viewers' preconceptions about relationships.
- IndieWire described it as a "fascinating and stylish new documentary."
- The Hollywood Reporter reviewed the film at its Rome Film Festival premiere, noting that "A world premiere at the Rome Film Festival could help boost notoriety abroad" and describing it as "a thorough expose on conjugal practices both past and present."
- Film Journal called Monogamish "a thorough expose of conjugal practices both past and present."
- Film Threat critic Bradley Gibson described the documentary as "an intelligent meditative film regardless of your stance on monogamy," praising its fair examination of both monogamous and non-monogamous perspectives.

== Cultural context ==
The film was released during a period of increasing public discourse about alternative relationship structures, coinciding with growing acceptance of non-traditional relationship models in American culture. The documentary's exploration of these themes through a personal lens contributed to this trend of humanizing polyamory and open relationships.

== See also ==
- Polyamory
- Open relationship
- Being in the World (Ruspoli's previous documentary)
