= The Anatomy Lesson (Morley novel) =

1995 novel by John David Morley

- First edition (US)
- Author: John David Morley
- Language: English
- Genre: Fiction, Bildungsroman, philosophical
- Publisher: Abacus Books (UK); St. Martin's Press (US)
- Publication date: 1995
- Media type: Print (hardback & paperback)
- Pages: 184 (US hardback)
- ISBN: 0-349-10628-2 (UK); 0-312-13426-6 (US)

The Anatomy Lesson (1995) is a novel by John David Morley, inspired by Rembrandt’s painting The Anatomy Lesson of Dr. Nicolaes Tulp.

== Summary ==
In Amsterdam, the streetwise, drug-addled, Dutch-American teenager Kiddo lives in the shadow of his hero-worshipped older brother, Morton, a brilliant science student who, having completed his physics and engineering Ph.D., is to take up a fellowship at M.I.T. But, after Morton’s premature death from a virulent strain of cancer, Kiddo begins to uncover a shadow-side to his brother’s existence, even as he wrestles with the anguished question of Morton’s dying wish: that he attend the autopsy in which his own brother’s corpse will be dissected.

== Reception ==
"Contemporary American fiction often forces on its readers a choice between head and heart. Mr. Morley's small, brilliant anatomy of love and loss succeeds in providing both," wrote novelist Rand Richards Cooper in The New York Times Book Review, seeing in Morley’s authorial output to date "a protean creative intelligence at work." "Not since Catcher in the Rye has anyone published so mesmerizing a piece of fiction about a disaffected teenager trying not to cope with reality," judged Deloris Tarzan Ament in The Seattle Times. "An incredibly depressing, dead-on portrait of inept parents and aimless youth," concluded Joanne Wilkinson in Booklist. "Blackly funny," wrote Alex Clark in The Observer, "but breathtakingly bleak." "John David Morley is known to European and American literary connoisseurs as a writer who merits serious attention", Bettina Drew wrote in The Washington Post, before hailing the author's latest work as "a serious meditation on despair and loss and our inability to really know the people we love."

After Pictures from the Water Trade in 1985 and The Feast of Fools in 1994, The Anatomy Lesson became the third of Morley's novels to be designated a notable book by The New York Times Book Review.
