= Kyle Thiermann =

American author (born 1990)

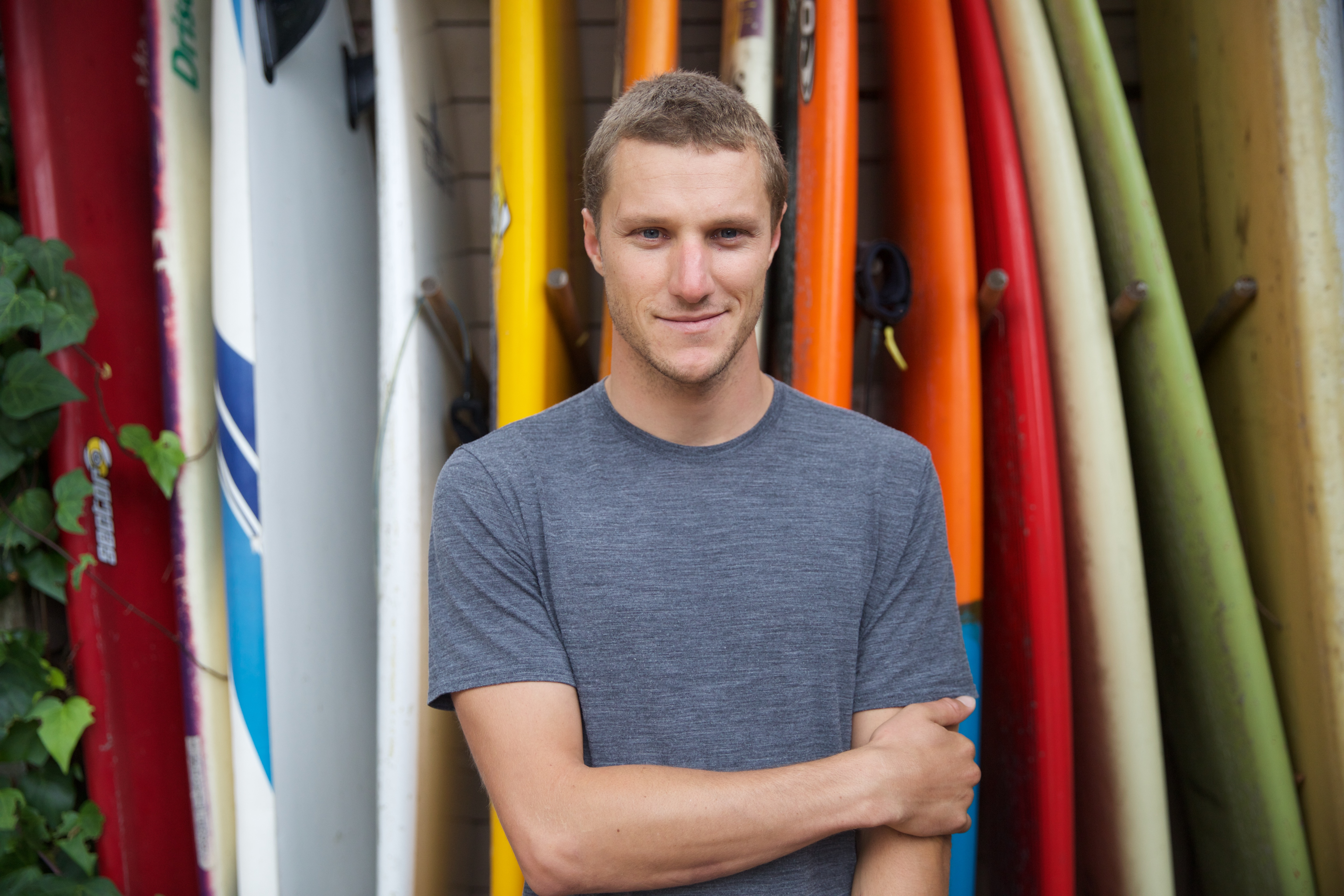
- Kyle Thiermann in front of surf boards in his backyard
- Born: January 9, 1990 (age 36); Santa Cruz, CA
- Citizenship: United States of America
- Education: Gaia University
- Occupations: Surfer, Journalist, Environmental activist
- Employer(s): Patagonia, MUD/WTR, Santa Cruz Waves Magazine
- Organization: Surfing For Change
- Website: kylethiermann.com

Kyle Thiermann (born January 9, 1990) is a professional surfer, writer, podcast host from Santa Cruz, California.

== Career ==
Kyle Thiermann is a journalist, podcast host, and writer.

From 2014-2017, he worked with Discovery Digital Networks as an on-camera correspondent. He frequently appears on their Seeker Stories, DNews, and VR channels. He also works closely with his main surf sponsor, Patagonia a company he has surfed for professionally since 2008.

In 2018, Thiermann co-created The Motherfucker Awards with author Chris Ryan. At a sold-out gala in LA, famous comedians represented the corporations that did the most to screw Mother Earth and gave acceptance speeches on their behalf. The aim of the show is to create corporate accountability through comedy.

Thiermann speaks at universities throughout the country and in 2011 he gave a TEDx Talk in his wetsuit. His surfing and film making successes have earned him the Brower Youth Award, American Clean Skies Award, Blue Vision Youth Award, and Surfrider's Pro Surfer Environmental Achievement Award.

== Early career ==
From ages 18–25, Thiermann created and hosted the YouTube series Surfing For Change. His channel has more than 2.5 million views. While traveling to the best waves around the world, Thiermann created gonzo-style mini-documentaries about current environmental issues happening in the regions. In the series, Thiermann focused on the power people have to create a better world through everyday decisions.

His first YouTube video in the series details how money kept in multinational banks can be used to finance destructive projects all over the world. This video inspired people to move millions of dollars out of centralized banks and into local banks and credit unions, and reached people throughout North America, South America, Africa and much of Europe.

Thiermann explains, “Because I see a big disconnect between the people who are doing awesome work in world and their ability to communicate that work with the rest of world. I see myself as a conduit between people and big organizations, and I package their stories in a way that is digestive enough so that they can take action."

Thiermann has covered controversial stories all over the world. These stories have included the Indonesian trash epidemic, GMO protests in Hawaii, working conditions in Sri Lanka, nuclear power in South Africa, and the adverse effects of surf tourism in Nicaragua. He graduated from Gaia University with a Bachelors of Science in Green Business with a focus in Media.
