= Feast of Fools (disambiguation) =

Feast of Fools may refer to:

- The Feast of Fools, a medieval feast day
- The Feast of Fools, a 1994 novel
- Feast of Fun, formerly titled Feast of Fools, a talk show podcast
- The Festival of Fools, a street festival in Belfast
