= In the Labyrinth =

In the Labyrinth may refer to:

- In the Labyrinth (film), presented at Expo 67 in Montreal
- In the Labyrinth (novel), a novel by John David Morley
- In the Labyrinth (supplement), a 1980 role-playing game supplement for The Fantasy Trip
