= Collective self-limitation =

Expression of collective autonomy

Self-limitation refers to the act of voluntarily adhering to self-defined boundaries in one's future actions. Self-limitation is therefore considered an expression of individual autonomy and can hence be contrasted against the imposition of external limitations. Collective self-limitation or Collectively defined self-limitation correspondingly refers to the definition of such limits within groups and societies, through which the group and members of the group are subsequently meant to realize collective aims.

Collective self-limitation at a societal level is an instrumental argument in contemporary debates surrounding political ecology as well as related political currents such as degrowth. In this context, self-limitation has been proposed as “the only non-authoritarian, democratic way towards an eco-compatible industrial civilization.” Collectively defined self-limitation has thus been proposed as the underlying principle of establishing commensurate societal boundaries or thresholds that would allow humanity to exist within the confines described by the planetary boundaries framework.

== History ==
The socio-political concept of self-limitation in its current form originates in the works of social philosophers André Gorz and Cornelius Castoriadis. Gorz called for individuals to self-limit their work as part of his criticism of work.

== Background ==
Elements of collective self-limitation are apparent in modern Western philosophy. For instance, Habermas puts forward the notion that individuals’ environments are conducive to the emergence of morally-rational actions and “do in fact appear in modern societies and are proliferating”.

Proponents of collective self-limitation postulate an ongoing transition from a class to a risk society. Positive-sum elements associated with a ‘bigger slice of pie’ in society thus diminish and are instead replaced with negative-sum elements, resulting in ‘collective self-injury’. Within this argument, individuals’ actions both harm themselves and the bigger collective, with no apparent net gain. Certain groups are more harmed than others and thus become marginalized. As such, whereas resources and power should be taken away from the exploiters to resolve the aforementioned issue, the marginalized must also argue for compensation.

== Methods and Strategies ==
Offe argues that state politics and governmental action cannot suffice as mechanisms that control collective self-injury and the exploitation of groups. Instead, change arises at the societal level, amidst ‘the public’ who orient their actions in accordance to collective, self-binding rules. These rules emphasize “self-restraint, self-limitation, responsibility, and moderation”. Open-minded communication adhering to Discourse ethics upholding certain procedures is seen as the key method of establishing of such rules. This includes the elimination of prejudices, preconceived strategic interests, and narrow-mindedness from open communication.

== Criticism ==
Collective self-limitation contradicts traditions of formal ethics put forward by German philosopher Georg Wilhelm Friedrich Hegel. He emphasized that individual morality and rationality are unable to yield lasting, effective change. Instead, individuals only adhere to changes made when introduced and validated by force.

Hegel's philosophy is based on that notion that universal ideas are the resultant of particular interests rather than the collective morally-rational good.
