= The Anatomy Lesson =

The Anatomy Lesson may refer to:

- The Anatomy Lesson of Dr. Nicolaes Tulp, a painting by Rembrandt
- The Anatomy Lesson of Dr. Deijman, a painting by Rembrandt
- The Anatomy Lesson (Roth novel), a 1983 novel by Philip Roth
- The Anatomy Lesson (Morley novel), a 1995 novel by John David Morley
