= Esther Perel =

Belgian psychotherapist and author (born 1958)

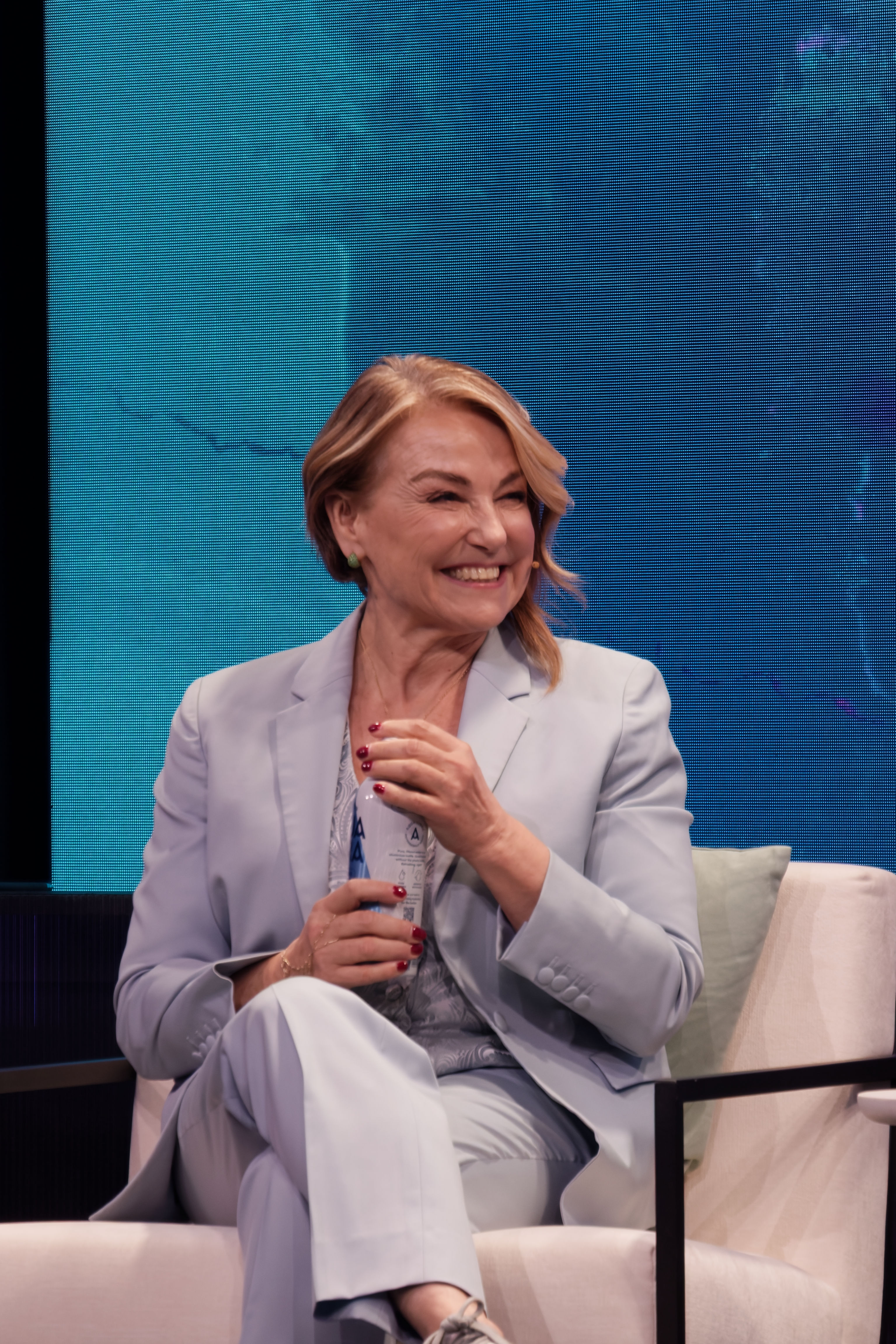
- Perel in 2026
- Born: August 13, 1958 (age 68); Leuven, Belgium
- Education: Hebrew University of Jerusalem; Lesley University
- Occupation: Psychotherapist
- Notable work: Mating in Captivity: Unlocking Erotic Intelligence (2006)
- Spouse: Jack Saul (m. 1985)
- Children: 2
- Scientific career
- Fields: Psychotherapy
- Workplaces: New York University
- Website: estherperel.com

Esther Perel (French: [pəʁɛl]; born August 13, 1958) is a Belgian psychotherapist, known for her work on human relationships.

Perel promoted the concept of "erotic intelligence" in her book Mating in Captivity: Unlocking Erotic Intelligence (2006), which has been translated into 24 languages. After publishing the book, she became an international advisor on sex and relationships. She has given two TED talks, hosts two podcasts, appears in the 2017 documentary, Monogamish, teaches a relational intelligence class with MasterClass, runs a series of therapy training, supervision events, and launched a card game.

Perel toured internationally with a live show called An Evening with Esther Perel: The Future of Relationships, Love and Desire. In July of 2026, Apple TV announced that Perel would serve as the relationship expert and principal matchmaker on a new eight-episode dating documentary series, “The Last Person on Earth.”

In 2026, Perel served as a consultant on The Invite, a film directed by Olivia Wilde.

== Early life and education ==
Perel was born and raised in Antwerp, Belgium, as the daughter of Sala Ferlegier and Icek Perel, two Polish Jewish Holocaust survivors. She has one brother, Leon.

Perel attended the Hebrew University of Jerusalem in Israel, where she earned a B.A. in educational psychology and French literature, and subsequently earned a master's degree in expressive art therapy from Lesley University in Cambridge, Massachusetts in the United States.

Perel grew up amongst Holocaust survivors in Antwerp, and later categorized them into two groups: "those who didn't die, and those who came back to life".

When she tours in Europe, Perel gives talks in different languages, not only English.

== Career ==
Perel initially trained in psychodynamic psychotherapy before finding a professional home in family systems theory initially as a student in the Intensive Certificate Program in Couple and Family Therapy at the Family Institute of Cambridge, which is taught at Therapy Training Boston. She initially worked as a cross-cultural psychotherapist with couples and families. For 13 years she was a clinical instructor at the New York University School of Medicine.

Perel has also worked as an actress (appearing in the 2017 film Newness, as herself), and runs a clothing boutique in Antwerp.

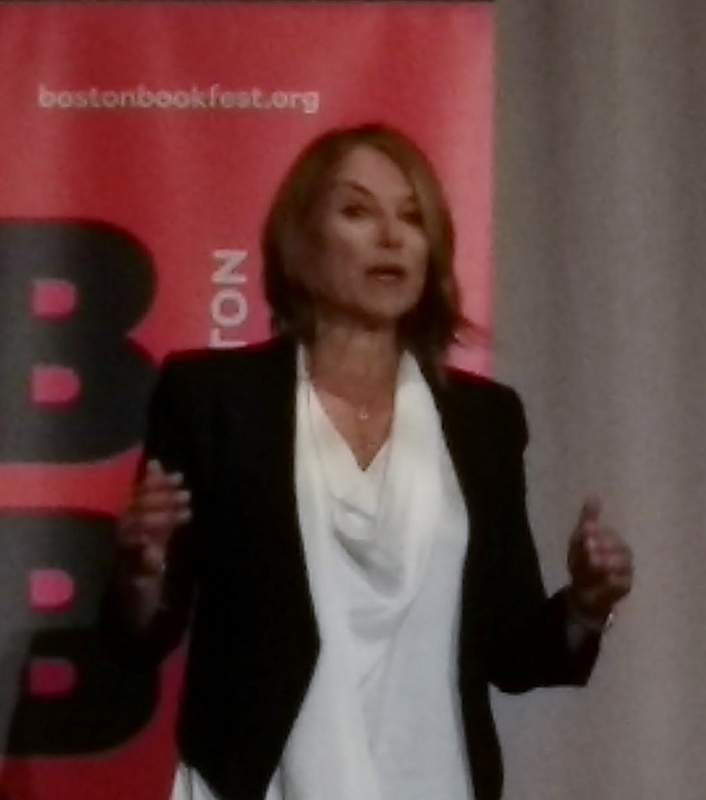
Perel in Boston in 2017

== Ideas ==
=== Expectations ===
Perel argues that, due to trends such as the secularization of Western society, the rise of individualism, and the societal "mandate" for personal happiness, the expectations for romantic relationships are higher than ever:

Never before have our expectations of marriage taken on such epic proportions. We still want everything the traditional family was meant to provide—security, children, property, and respectability—but now we also want our partner to love us, to desire us, to be interested in us. We should be best friends, trusted confidants, and passionate lovers to boot.

== Podcasts ==
Perel is the host of two podcasts: Where Should We Begin? and How's Work?

- Where Should We Begin? brings the listeners inside Perel's therapist's office as she sees anonymous couples in search of insight on everything from infidelity to sexlessness to grief. The unique format combines live recordings of the therapy session, with Perel's reflections on what she heard, and what techniques she tried. The New York Times writes: "it feels more like an unraveling mystery story than a relationship advice show." The couples include both heterosexual and same-sex couples. The first episode aired on Audible in May 2017, and became publicly available on iTunes on October 9, 2017. Three seasons have been released as of December 2019. "Where Should We Begin?" received a 2018 Gracie Award.
- How's Work? is Perel's second podcast. It follows a format similar to the couples therapy session in "Where Should We Begin?", but this time the couple seeking Perel's advice are cofounders or colleagues, navigating the challenges that play out in work relationships. HuffPost describes each episode as a "one-time therapy session between Perel and various co-founders, members of family businesses and partners with a thriving operation but deteriorating relations on the job." As described in one review: "The podcast aims to shine light on the things that form us as individuals and how those things relate to life in the workplace. Because, honestly, a lot of people hold their careers and workplace relationships as dearly and tightly as they do their romantic relationships." "How's Work?" was created by Gimlet Media, and was available exclusively on Spotify. The show first aired in November 2019. In March 2023, Bloomberg announced that "How's Work?" was acquired by Vox Media's Podcast Network.

== Publications ==
- Mating in Captivity: Unlocking Erotic Intelligence, initially subtitled Reconciling the Erotic and the Domestic (2006, Harper, ISBN 978-0060753634)
- The State of Affairs: Rethinking Infidelity (2017, Harper, ISBN 978-0062322586)

== Recognition ==
In 2016, Perel was named to Oprah Winfrey's Supersoul 100 list of visionaries and influential leaders.

In 2021, Perel was selected for the inaugural 2021 Forbes 50 Over 50; made up of entrepreneurs, leaders, scientists and creators who are over the age of 50.

== Personal life ==
Perel is Jewish, and says of it, "You can't know me without it."

Perel is married to Jack Saul, Assistant Professor of Clinical Population and Family Health at Columbia University Mailman School of Public Health. They met at Lesley University when she was 22 or 23; he is 7 years her senior. After 2 years of being close friends, they became a couple.

== Sources ==
- In search of Erotic Intelligence: Reconciling our desire for comfortable domesticity and hot sex
- Sexual Genius: An Interview With Esther Perel
- Esther Perel on Mating in Captivity
