= Ritual behavior in animals =

Ritual behavior in non-humans

Animal faith is the study of animal behaviours that suggest proto-religious faith. It is commonly believed that religion and faith are unique to humans, as worship, prayer, and belief in gods has not been observed in non-human animals. However, by using a "non-anthropocentric and non-anthropomorphic prototype definition" of religion, such as the one developed by James Harrod in his 2011 work "A Trans-Species Definition of Religion," scientists can study animal religious practices and behaviors.

Ritual behaviors are most commonly studied in chimpanzees, elephants, and dolphins, but such behaviors have also been observed in other animals, such as magpies, crows and orcas.

== Ritual behaviour in apes ==
Nancy R. Howell suggests that "chimpanzees and bonobos may have the precursors for culture and spirituality, such as connectedness, interdependence and sociality and a level of 'symbolic capacity'". Primatologist Jane Goodall goes further, noting that some chimpanzees may "dance" at the onset of heavy rain or when they come across a waterfall. She speculates that "their 'elemental' displays are precursors of religious ritual".

== Funeral rites in animals ==
While grief is common to many animals, funeral rituals are not. However, they are well documented in African elephants. Elephants mainly react to elephant remains, occasionally to those of humans, but for other species they ignore. Asian elephants have also been observed to bury their dead calf in a 2024 study.

Both wild and captive chimpanzees engage in ritualized behaviors at the death of a group member. These behaviors begin with group or individual silence, which may last for hours and followed by behaviors such as distinctive vocalizations; grooming the carcass; solemn visitation and gazing at the carcass by group members; displays; and lamentation-like whimpers or hoo-calls of distress.

Attention to the dead is not unique to elephants or chimpanzees. Dolphins have been known to stay with recently deceased members of their pod for several days, preventing divers from getting close. However, the reasons for this remain obscure. While scientists can observe their actions, the thought processes that motivate them are beyond current study.

Tahlequah (a.k.a. J35), a female orca, carried the carcass of her newborn infant for 17 days. Whether this was a "tour of grief" or merely instinct is debated.

Crows and other corvids also seem to participate in funeral-like ritualistic behavior, including gathering around and holding vigils over the carcass.

== Relevance to the study of early modern humans ==
The ritual lives of animals are of interest to paleoanthropologists, as they provide a convenient insight into how religious belief systems may have developed in our ancestors. "The skeletal remains of Cro-Magnon man are found buried in the fetal position in line with the primitive myth that such a position facilitates rebirth. The study of allied behaviours in non-human animals provides an opportunity to understand their nature and function in man." Indeed, some have seen superficial similarities between the funeral rituals of African elephants and the burial rituals of Neanderthals.

Evolutionary psychologist Matt Rossano has theorised that religion evolved in three stages: In the pre-Upper Palaeolithic, religion was characterised by ecstatic rituals used to facilitate social bonding. Later, shamanic healing rituals developed in the Upper Palaeolithic. Finally, religious expressions developed over time to include cave art, ritual artefacts, ancestor worship and the development of myth and moral structures. If this is true, then the behaviour of chimpanzees witnessed by Goodall may be interpreted as similar to pre-Upper Paleolithic Human religion. However, De Waal notes that bonobos show no evidence of ritual behaviour yet are extremely peaceful and demonstrate moral agency. This casts doubt on the co-development of morality and proto-religion.

== See also ==
- Evolutionary ethics
- Evolutionary origin of religion
- Evolution of morality
- The Origins of Virtue
- Veneer theory
