= Ella Morris (novel) =

Novel by John David Morley

- First Edition
- Author: John David Morley
- Language: English
- Genre: Fiction, Philosophical
- Publisher: Weidenfeld & Nicolson
- Publication date: September 25, 2014
- Media type: Print (Paperback) & ebook
- Pages: 948 pp
- ISBN: 978-0-29-787172-9

Ella Morris is the tenth novel by John David Morley, a story of Europe, about the calamities which befell the continent in the 20th century. The book's focus is the Morris family: its matriarch Ella; her husband George, a British civil servant of Hungarian descent; her lover Claude de Marsay, a French student ten years her junior whom she meets in Paris; and Ella's four children, all of whom must navigate a world still scarred by the legacy of the Second World War.

Born in Berlin on the eve of Hitler's rise to power, Ella Andrzejewski was seventeen years old when she was caught up in the advance of the Red Army in 1945. A victim of Russian violence, her plight is echoed decades later by the fate of Nadine, an Austrian woman of Albanian descent whom Ella's son Alex meets during the course of the Balkan war, and with whom he subsequently falls in love.

== Summary ==
After a happy childhood in her grandmother's house, young Ella Andrzejewski becomes one of the millions of refugees displaced by the Second World War. She escapes to England, marries George Morris and has three children with him, a fourth by Claude de Marsay. The ménage-à-trois established in the London years remains intact after the Morris family moves to Tenerife. Ella works in local government for the department of the environment and George writes thrillers based on his early career at the Foreign Office and MI6. After an assignment in Japan that separates him from Ella for six years, Claude returns to teach at the island university.

A second intermittent narrative beginning in the 1990s meanwhile follows the career of Alex, Ella's son by Claude, as a journalist in the former Yugoslavia. A third narrative interlaced with the first two explores the life of Max, Ella's eldest son by George. With Ella as the pivot and ultimate focus of these three interwoven narratives, moving between war and peace zones at different times in different places, the novel that begins as a family saga becomes increasingly a meditation on environmental collapse. Above all, Ella Morris is the portrait of a woman's survival of the troubled times she lives in without surrendering the commitment to humanity she regards as her personal responsibility.

== Reception ==
Writing in The Times, Kate Saunders acclaimed Ella Morris as an epic of our times: “This isn’t just big, it’s gigantic. It’s a third of Proust and only a few pages short of War and Peace. Ella Morris had to be this length, however, to fit John David Morley’s ambitious vision, a complex, fascinating family saga, set against the equally complex history of the 20th century… The pace of this epic is stately yet never too slow; the sheer scale of the thing is breathtaking.” Tribune proclaimed the novel “little short of a masterpiece… This Tolstoyan work takes us into the heart of what it means to be both English and European in the 20th Century."
