= Slovenska smer =

- Author: Slavoj Žižek; Dimitrij Rupel; Tine Hribar; Peter Vodopivec; Jože Mencinger; Dušan Keber; Veljko Rus; Lojze Ude; Marko Crnkovič
- Language: Slovenian
- Genre: Politics; Political Science; Philosophy
- Publisher: Cankarjeva založba
- Publication date: 1996
- Publication place: Slovenia
- Media type: Paperback
- Pages: 240
- ISBN: 978-86-361-0986-1

Slovenska smer is a Slovene book containing collected papers from Slavoj Žižek, Dimitrij Rupel, Tine Hribar, Peter Vodopivec, Jože Mencinger, Dušan Keber, Lojze Ude and Veljko Rus, edited by Marko Crnkovič. It was published at Cankarjeva založba (Cankar's Publishing), Ljubljana, in 1996. It first has an introduction written by the editor titled Being smart as a political conviction, then a conversation between the authors about different topics (Nation, Church, Ethics, etc.), then 8 essays follow (A report about Slovenia, Third way between universalism and fundamentalism, Legal state and public interest, The advantages and disadvantages of a small economy, Autonomy and integration of the university, The problem of a small state, etc.) and then a short summary at the end (How it was, how it is, and how to go on).
