= The Origins of Virtue =

1996 book by Matt Ridley

- Cover of the first edition
- Author: Matt Ridley
- Language: English
- Subject: Sociobiology
- Publisher: Viking (Penguin Books)
- Publication date: 1996
- Publication place: United Kingdom
- Media type: Print (Hardcover)
- Pages: 295
- ISBN: 0-670-86357-2
- OCLC: 36117654
- Dewey Decimal: 304.5 21
- LC Class: QH366.2 .R525 1996

The Origins of Virtue is a 1996 popular science book by Matt Ridley, which has been recognised as a classic in its field. In the book, Ridley explores the issues surrounding the development of human morality. The book, written from a sociobiological viewpoint, explores how genetics can be used to explain certain traits of human behaviour, in particular morality and altruism.

Starting from the premise that society can, on a simplistic level, be represented as a variant of the prisoner's dilemma, Ridley examines how it has been possible for a society to arise in which people choose to cooperate with others, rather than "defect" and act purely in their own self-interest.

Ridley examines the history of different attempts to explain the fact that humans in society do not defect, looking at various computer generated models that have been used to explain how such behaviour could arise. In particular, he looks at systems based on the idea of Tit-for-tat, a program developed by Canadian professor Anatol Rapoport, where members of the group only cooperate with those who also cooperate, and exclude those who do not. This results in the optimum solution to the dilemma being to cooperate, allowing altruistic behaviour to develop. He applies this to humans and suggests that genes that generated altruistic, tit-for-tat behaviour would be likely to be passed on and therefore give rise to the kind of behaviour we see in human society.

Ridley then examines the development of tribal mentality, group prejudice, the benefits of trade, and ineffective government regulation.

From this, Ridley argues that society operates best in groups of around 150 individuals, which he suggests is the level at which humans are capable of being sure about which members to cooperate with and which to exclude. Although he avoids drawing any specific political points, Ridley ends his book by arguing for a smaller state operating on a more local level.

== See also ==
- Animal Faith
- Evolutionary ethics
- Evolution of morality
