= Stephanie Coontz =

American author, historian, and faculty member at Evergreen State College

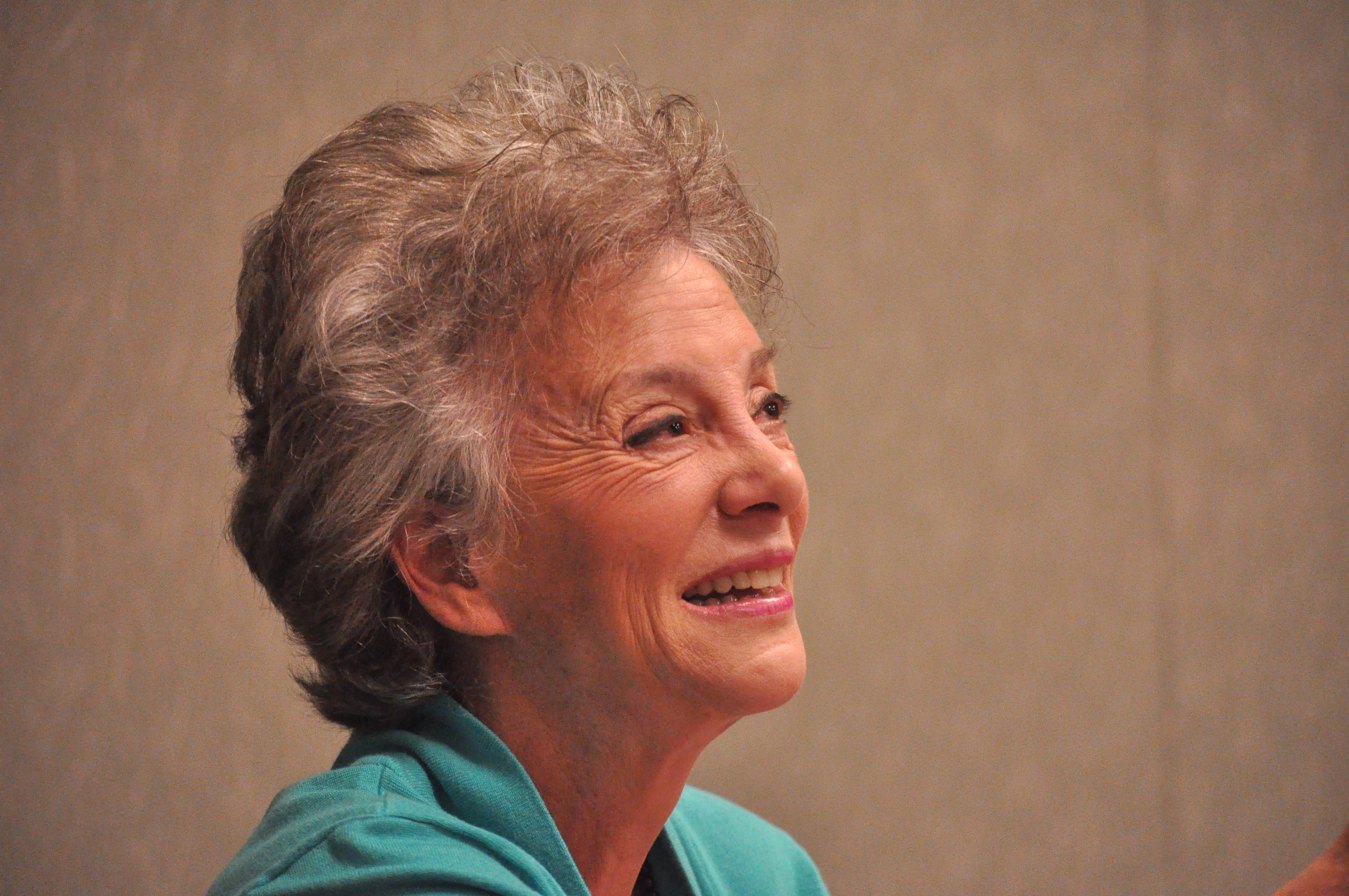
- Stephanie Coontz, speaking at the University of Washington (2012).
- Born: August 31, 1944 (age 82)
- Education: University of California, Berkeley
- Occupations: Historian, author, faculty member at The Evergreen State College
- Website: www.stephaniecoontz.com

Stephanie Coontz (born August 31, 1944) is an American author, historian, and faculty emeritus of the Evergreen State College. She taught history and family studies and was Director of Research and Public Education for the Council on Contemporary Families, which she chaired from 2001 to 2004. Coontz has authored and co-edited several books about the history of the family and marriage. She is featured in Monogamish, 2017 a documentary exploring contemporary attitudes toward monogamy, marriage, and alternative relationship structures within American society.

== Education and early career ==
Coontz earned a Bachelor of Arts from the American History Honors Program (1966) at the University of California, Berkeley, where she was a member of the campus political party SLATE and participated in the civil rights movement and the Free Speech Movement. Attending the University of Washington on a Woodrow Wilson Fellowship, she earned a Master of Arts in European History (1970). Abandoning further graduate work, she joined the staff of the National Peace Action Coalition, later becoming a National Coordinator; they focused on building peaceful, legal demonstrations against the Vietnam War. Before returning to full-time teaching in 1975, Coontz also had a leadership role in the Young Socialist Alliance, a Trotskyist youth group of the Socialist Workers Party (SWP). By the late 1970s, however, Coontz had parted company with the SWP.

== Personal life ==
Coontz was born in Seattle, Washington in 1944 to Sidney Coontz and Patricia McIntosh. Sidney Coontz was a labor organizer and professor of economics whose career took his family to universities in California, Idaho, England, New York and Utah. Patricia McIntosh divorced her husband in the 1960s, returning to her own academic studies and becoming a professor of English.

Coontz was engaged early in her career, but the engagement was broken off. Many years later, she married her college sweetheart.

She has one child, who she raised as a single parent for most of their childhood. She has one grandchild, to whom her book For Better Or Worse is dedicated.

== Academic career ==
Coontz was hired as faculty at Evergreen in 1975, where she taught until her retirement in 2012.

Coontz has also taught at Kobe University in Japan and the University of Hawaiʻi at Hilo. She won the Washington Governor's Writers Award in 1989 for her book The Social Origins of Private Life: A History of American Families. In 1995 she received the Dale Richmond Award from the American Academy of Pediatrics for her "outstanding contributions to the field of child development." She received the 2001-02 "Friend of the Family" award from the Illinois Council on Family Relations. In 2004, she received the first-ever "Visionary Leadership" Award from the Council on Contemporary Families.

Coontz studies the history of American families, marriage, and changes in gender roles. Her book The Way We Never Were argues against several common myths about families of the past, including the idea that the 1950s family was traditional or the notion that families used to rely solely on their own resources. Her book, Marriage, A History: How Love Conquered Marriage, traces the history of marriage from Mark Antony and Cleopatra (not a love story, she argues) to debates over same-sex marriage. Her newest book, about the wives and daughters of "The Greatest Generation," is A Strange Stirring: The Feminine Mystique and American Women at the Dawn of the 1960s.

Coontz has appeared on national television and radio programs, including Oprah, the Today Show, The Colbert Report and dozens of NPR shows. In addition, her work has been featured in newspapers and magazines, as well as in many academic and professional journals. She has testified about her research before the House Select Committee on Children, Youth, and Families and addressed audiences across America, Europe, and Japan.

In the landmark United States Supreme Court case Obergefell v. Hodges, Associate Justice Anthony Kennedy cited Coontz's book Marriage, A History in its decision to grant marriage equality to same-sex couples.

== Books ==
- Coontz, Stephanie. Women's Work, Men's Property: The Origins of Gender and Class. London: Verso Books, 1986. ISBN 0-860-91112-8.
- Coontz, Stephanie. The Way We Never Were: American Families and the Nostalgia Trap. New York: Basic Books, 1992. ISBN 0-465-09097-4.
- Coontz, Stephanie. The Way We Really Are: Coming to Terms with America's Changing Families. Basic Books, 1998. ISBN 0-465-09092-3.
- Coontz, Stephanie. The Social Origins of Private Life - A History of American Families 1600-1900. London: Verso Books, 1998. ISBN 0-860-91191-8.
- Coontz, Stephanie., ed. American Families: A Multicultural Reader. London: Routledge, 1999. ISBN 0-415-91574-0.
- Coontz, Stephanie. Marriage, A History: From Obedience to Intimacy, or How Love Conquered Marriage. New York: Viking Press, 2005. ISBN 0-670-03407-X.
- Coontz, Stephanie; Parson, Maya; Riley, Gabrielle (eds.). American Families: A Multicultural Reader. New York and London: Routledge, 2008. ISBN 0-415-95821-0
- Coontz, Stephanie. A Strange Stirring: The Feminine Mystique and American Women at the Dawn of the 1960s. New York: Basic Books, 2011. ISBN 0-465-00200-5
- Coontz, Stephanie. The Way We Never Were: American Families and the Nostalgia Trap (revised edition). New York: Basic Books, 2016. ISBN 0-465-09883-5
- Coontz, Stephanie. For Better and Worse: The Complicated Past and Challenging Future of Marriage. Viking, 2026. ISBN 0-593-29909-4.

== Recent essays ==
- "Why Parents Don’t Mind if Their Kids Don’t Marry," The Atlantic, July 31, 2024.
- "Inside the Changing Role of Fathers in America," Top of Mind with Julie Rose, July 31, 2024.
- "Why Is the Pundit Class Suddenly So Marriage-Obsessed?," Politico, January 31, 2024.
- "Why Aren't Millennials Having Children?," on Wisconsin Public Radio's Central Time, Nov. 30, 2023.
- "Op-ed: American history is a parade of horrors - and also heroes," Los Angeles Times, Aug. 31, 2022.
- "The one book about marriage I wish I’d read before my wedding," The Washington Post, May 31, 2022.
- "How to make your marriage gayer," The New York Times, Feb. 29, 2020.
- "Summer wedding season is upon us — but outdated, gendered traditions don't have to be," NBC News, Jul. 31, 2019.
- "Getting Angry at the Right Targets in the Right Way," The American Prospect, Jan. 22, 2019.
- "The Nostalgia Trap," Harvard Business Review, Apr. 10, 2018
- "For a Better Marriage, Act Like a Single Person," The New York Times, Feb. 10, 2018.
- "How unmarried Americans are changing everything," CNN, Sep. 22, 2017.
- "Nixon was right about women," CNN, Aug. 27, 2017.
- "Ivanka Trump is right," CNN, Jul. 8, 2017.
- "Do Millennial Men Want Stay-at-Home Wives?," The New York Times, Mar. 31, 2017.
- "How 'The Mary Tyler Moore Show' made a difference," CNN, Jan. 27, 2017.
- "Why the white working class ditched Clinton," CNN, Nov. 11, 2016.
- "The shell-shocked white working class," CNN, Sep. 23, 2016.
- "Generation X and millennials may have found a new secret to sexual happiness," The New York Times, Aug. 5, 2016.
- "Can the Working Family Work in America?," The American Prospect, May 17, 2016.
- "The awkward truth of ‘make America great again’," CNN, Apr. 29, 2016.
- "The Moynihan Family Circus," Bookforum, May 31, 2015.
- "The Real Story of the American Family," The American Prospect, May 14, 2015.
- "Now who's the moral majority?," CNN, Apr. 6, 2015.
- "Want better sex, dads? Then take paternity leave," The Guardian, Apr. 2, 2015.
- "The New Deal and Civil Rights Helped Make the Dream More Attainable," The New York Times, Jan. 31, 2015; updated Sep. 29, 2015.
- "The New Instability," The New York Times, Jul. 26, 2014.
- "Women have come a long way, but still have far to go," Courier Journal, Mar. 16, 2014.
- "Who still can’t sit at America’s table," CNN, Feb. 11, 2014.
- "How Can We Help Men? By Helping Women," The New York Times, Jan. 11, 2014.
- "Why 'war on poverty' not over," CNN, Jan. 6, 2014.
- "There Is No Such Thing as the 'Traditional Male Breadwinner'," TIME, Sep. 23, 2013.
- "The Disestablishment of Marriage," The New York Times, Jun. 22, 2013.
- "The Not-So-Good Old Days," The New York Times, Jun. 15, 2013.
- "Progress At Work, But Mothers Still Pay a Price," The New York Times, Jun. 8, 2013.
- "The Triumph of the Working Mother," The New York Times, Jun. 1, 2013.
- "When Numbers Mislead," The New York Times, May 25, 2013.
- "Beware Social Nostalgia," The New York Times, May 18, 2013.
- "Yes, I've folded up my masculine mystique, honey," The Sunday Times, Feb. 24, 2013.
- "Why Gender Equality Stalled," The New York Times, February 16, 2013.
- "The Myth of Male Decline," The New York Times, September 29, 2012.
- "Can this royal marriage survive?," CNN, April 30, 2011.
- "Economic Disparity Takes Toll on Marriage," The Philadelphia Inquirer, January 9, 2011.
- "Gay marriage isn't revolutionary. It's just the next step in marriage's evolution," The Washington Post, January 7, 2011.
- "Taking Marriage Private," The New York Times, November 26, 2007.
- "The Family Revolution," Greater Good Magazine, Fall 2007.
- "Too Close for Comfort," The New York Times, November 7, 2006.
- "A Pop Quiz on Marriage," The New York Times, February 19, 2006.
- "Why Marriage Today Takes More Love and Work - From Both Partners," The Christian Science Monitor, June 28, 2005.
- "Our Kids Are Not Doomed," Los Angeles Times, May 9, 2005.
- "For Better, For Worse: Marriage Means Something Different Now," The Washington Post, May 1, 2005.

== Sources ==
- Young, Bob. "The Way We Never Were" (PDF). Legacy Washington.
