= Evolution of morality =

Emergence of human moral behavior over the course of human evolution

The concept of the evolution of morality refers to the emergence of human moral behavior over the course of human evolution. Morality can be defined as a system of ideas about right and wrong conduct. In everyday life, morality is typically associated with human behavior rather than animal behavior. The emerging fields of evolutionary biology, and in particular evolutionary psychology, have argued that, despite the complexity of human social behaviors, the precursors of human morality can be traced to the behaviors of many other social animals. Sociobiological explanations of human behavior remain controversial. Social scientists have traditionally viewed morality as a construct, and thus as culturally relative, although others such as Sam Harris argue that there is an objective science of morality.

Social animals, from eusocial insects like ants to empathetic mammals like elephants, develop complex cooperative behaviors—often involving self-restraint, altruism, or even reproductive sacrifice—because group living dramatically increases their chances of survival and reproductive success. Primate sociality, particularly among chimpanzees and bonobos, reveals evolutionary roots of human morality through shared traits like empathy, reciprocity, and fairness, suggesting that moral behavior developed to promote cooperation and cohesion in increasingly complex social groups.

The social brain hypothesis suggests primates evolved larger brains primarily to handle complex social networks. Theory of mind enabled them to understand others' mental states for navigating social interactions. Human altruism is seen as a unique, culturally influenced behavior shaped by both genetic and cultural evolution. Religion likely evolved by building on morality, introducing supernatural agents to encourage cooperation and restrain selfishness, which enhanced group survival. Additionally, emotions like disgust play a key evolutionary role in moral judgments by helping to avoid threats to health, reproduction, and social cohesion.

== Animal sociality ==
Though other animals may not possess what humans may perceive as moral behavior, all social animals have had to modify or restrain their behaviors for group living to be worthwhile. Typical examples of behavioral modification can be found in the societies of ants, bees and termites. Ant colonies may possess millions of individuals. E. O. Wilson argues that the single most important factor that leads to the success of ant colonies is the existence of a sterile worker caste. This caste of females are subservient to the needs of their mother, the queen, and in so doing, have given up their own reproduction in order to raise brothers and sisters. The existence of sterile castes among these social insects significantly restricts the competition for mating and in the process fosters cooperation within a colony. Cooperation among ants is vital, because a solitary ant has an improbable chance of long-term survival and reproduction. However, as part of a group, colonies can thrive for decades. As a consequence, ants are one of the most successful families of species on the planet, accounting for a biomass that rivals that of the human species.

The basic reason that social animals live in groups is that opportunities for survival and reproduction are much better in groups than living alone. The social behaviors of mammals are more familiar to humans. Highly social mammals such as primates and elephants have been known to exhibit traits that were once thought to be uniquely human, like empathy and altruism.

== Primate sociality ==
Humanity's closest living relatives are common chimpanzees and bonobos. These primates share a common ancestor with humans who lived four to six million years ago. It is for this reason that chimpanzees and bonobos are viewed as the best available surrogate for this common ancestor. Barbara J. King argues that while primates may not possess morality in the human sense, they do exhibit some traits that would have been necessary for the evolution of morality. These traits include high intelligence, a capacity for symbolic communication, a sense of social norms, realization of "self", and a concept of continuity. Frans de Waal and Barbara King both view human morality as having grown out of primate sociality. Many social animals such as primates, dolphins, and whales have shown to exhibit what Michael Shermer refers to as premoral sentiments. According to Shermer, the following characteristics are shared by humans and other social animals, particularly the great apes:

[...] attachment and bonding, cooperation and mutual aid, sympathy and empathy, direct and indirect reciprocity, altruism and reciprocal altruism, conflict resolution and peacemaking, deception and deception detection, community concern and caring about what others think about you, and awareness of and response to the social rules of the group.

Shermer argues that these premoral sentiments evolved in primate societies as a method of restraining individual selfishness and building more cooperative groups. For any social species, the benefits of being part of an altruistic group should outweigh the benefits of individualism. For example, lack of group cohesion could make individuals more vulnerable to attack from outsiders. Being part of a group may also improve the chances of finding food. This is evident among animals that hunt in packs to take down large or dangerous prey.

Social evolution of humans
Period years ago	Society type	Number of individuals
6,000,000	Bands	10s
100,000–10,000	Bands	10s–100s
10,000–5,000	Tribes	100s–1,000s
5,000–4,000	Chiefdoms	1,000s–10,000s
4,000–3,000	States	10,000s–100,000s
3,000–present	Empires	100,000–1,000,000s

All social animals live in groups of more or less closely related individuals, within which each group-member is aware of its own relation to its group-mates. Social order is maintained by certain rules of expected behavior and dominant group members may enforce order through punishment. However, most apes and some other primates also have a sense of reciprocity. Chimpanzees remember who did them favors and who did them wrong. For example, chimpanzees are more likely to share food with individuals who have previously groomed them. Vampire bats also demonstrate a sense of reciprocity and altruism. They share blood by regurgitation, but do not share randomly. They are most likely to share with other bats who have shared with them in the past or who are in dire need of feeding.

Animals such as Capuchin monkeys and dogs also display an understanding of fairness, refusing to co-operate when presented unequal rewards for the same behaviors.

Chimpanzees live in fission-fusion groups that average 50 individuals. It is likely that early ancestors of humans lived in groups of similar size. Based on the size of extant hunter-gatherer societies, recent paleolithic hominids lived in bands of a few hundred individuals. As community size increased over the course of human evolution, greater enforcement to achieve group cohesion would have been required. Morality may have evolved in these bands of 100 to 200 people as a means of social control, conflict resolution and group solidarity. This numerical limit is theorized to be hard coded in our genes since even modern humans have difficulty maintaining stable social relationships with more than 100–200 people. According to Dr. de Waal, human morality has two extra levels of sophistication that are not found in other primate societies. Humans enforce their society's moral codes much more rigorously with rewards, punishments and reputation building. People also apply a degree of judgment and reason not seen in the animal kingdom.

== Evolution of social cognition and altruism ==
The social brain hypothesis proposes that primates evolved large brains to manage complex social systems, showing a quantitative relationship between brain size and social group size, whereas in other mammals and birds, large brains are linked qualitatively to mating systems, with primates uniquely extending pairbonding cognitive processes to wider social bonds.

Theory of mind, an evolved capacity to understand others' mental states, likely developed in primates to navigate complex social interactions but can be selectively impaired in various psychiatric disorders, including autism and schizophrenia.

Ernst Fehr and Urs Fischbacher argue that human altruism is a unique and powerful force influenced by individual variation and the interaction between altruistic and selfish behaviors, emphasizing the role of cultural evolution and gene–culture co-evolution in addition to genetic factors.

== Evolution of religion ==
Psychologist Matt J. Rossano muses that religion emerged after morality and built upon morality by expanding the social scrutiny of individual behavior to include supernatural third-party agents. By including ever watchful ancestors, spirits and gods in the social realm, humans discovered an effective strategy for restraining selfishness and building more cooperative groups. The adaptive value of religion would have enhanced group survival.

== Social selection experiments ==
In an experiment where subjects must demonstrate abstract, complex reasoning, such as the Wason selection task, researchers have found that humans (as has been seen in other animals) have a strong innate ability to reason about social exchanges. This ability is believed to be intuitive, since the logical rules do not seem to be accessible to the individuals for use in situations without moral overtones.

A 2016 framework however integrates game theory, evolution, and learning to explain human moral behaviors without invoking group selection or a priori philosophical justifications.

Arguments against the possibility of moral progress have been argued to rely on narrow views of human nature and to fail because key moral traits like cosmopolitanism cannot be fully explained by evolution but instead arise from humans' unique capacity to develop new moral norms.

== Emotions ==
Disgust, one of the basic emotions, may have an important role in certain forms of morality. Disgust is argued to be a specific response to certain things or behaviors that are dangerous or undesirable from an evolutionary perspective. One example is things that increase the risk of an infectious disease such as spoiled foods, dead bodies, other forms of microbiological decomposition, a physical appearance suggesting sickness or poor hygiene, and various body fluids such as feces, vomit, phlegm, and blood. Another example is disgust against evolutionary disadvantageous mating such as incest (the incest taboo) or unwanted sexual advances. Still another example are behaviors that may threaten group cohesion or cooperation such as cheating, lying, and stealing. MRI studies have found that such situations activate areas in the brain associated with disgust.

== See also ==
- Animal faith
- Evolutionary ethics
- The Origins of Virtue
- Moral foundations theory
- Moral progress
- Moral realism
- Science of morality
- Triune ethics theory
- Veneer theory
