= The Case of Thomas N. =

1987 novel by John David Morley

- First Edition (US)
- Author: John David Morley
- Language: English
- Genre: Fiction, mystery, crime, philosophical
- Publisher: André Deutsch (UK); The Atlantic Monthly Press (US)
- Publication date: 1987
- Media type: Print (hardback)
- Pages: 214 pp (US edition)
- ISBN: 0-233-98150-0 (UK) ISBN 0-87113-152-8 (US)

The Case of Thomas N. (1987) is a novel by John David Morley.

== Summary ==
"Found by a police officer on a bench by the river" in an unnamed European city, a 16-year-old amnesiac boy is given the name ‘Thomas N.’ by state officials (‘N.’ being a bureaucratic abbreviation of ‘Name Unknown’), before being diagnosed as suffering from a "fear of anything that objectively demonstrated his existence". Explicitly referencing the mysterious 19th century case of Kaspar Hauser, the novel follows Thomas N.'s progress from psychiatric clinic to orphanage to an ostensibly normal existence living in a boarding-house and working in a nearby hotel. But soon he is embroiled in the investigation of an especially vicious and brutal murder, charged with a crime of which he has no memory of committing.

== Reception ==
"To refer to The Case of Thomas N. as a thriller-as-philosophical enquiry would convey, roughly, the mix of intellectual and narrative excitement it contains. But it would not do justice to the precision of Morley’s prose, the playful rigour of his ideas, or the suggestiveness of his method" wrote Robert Winder in The Independent, concluding: "Morley will some day be a name to be reckoned with." In her review in The Spectator, novelist Anita Brookner saw the book as "a fearsome piece of work… Mr. Morley has contrived a nightmare. A reminder of the European origins of the psychological novel, it is an achievement worthy of considerable respect."
