= Sex at Dawn =

2010 book by Christopher Ryan and Cacilda Jethá

- Cover of the first edition
- Authors: Christopher Ryan; Cacilda Jethá
- Language: English
- Subjects: Human sexuality Anthropology
- Publisher: Harper
- Publication date: June 29, 2010
- Publication place: United States
- Media type: Print (hardcover & paperback)
- Pages: 384
- ISBN: 978-0-06-170780-3
- LC Class: HQ12 .R93 2010

Sex at Dawn: The Prehistoric Origins of Modern Sexuality is a 2010 book about the evolution of human mating systems by Christopher Ryan and Cacilda Jethá. In opposition to what the authors see as the "standard narrative" of human sexual evolution, they contend that having multiple sexual partners was common and accepted in the environment of evolutionary adaptedness. The authors contend that mobile, self-contained groups of hunter-gatherers were the norm for humans before agriculture led to high population density. Before agriculture, according to the authors, sex was relatively promiscuous and paternity was not a concern. This dynamic is similar to the mating system of bonobos. According to the book, sexual interactions strengthened the bond of trust in the groups. Far from causing jealousy, social equilibrium and reciprocal obligation were strengthened by playful sexual interactions.

The book generated a great deal of publicity in the popular press where it was met with generally positive reviews. Conversely, numerous scholars from related academic disciplines—such as anthropology, evolutionary psychology, primatology, biology, and sexology—have been highly critical of the book's methodology and conclusions, although some have commended its arguments.

== Summary ==
The authors argue that human beings evolved in egalitarian hunter-gatherer bands in which sexual interaction was a shared resource, much like food, child care, and group defense.

The authors believe that much of evolutionary psychology has been conducted with a bias regarding human sexuality. They argue that the public and many researchers are guilty of the "Flintstonization" of a hunter-gatherer society, i.e. projecting modern assumptions and beliefs onto earlier societies. Thus the authors believe that there is a false assumption that our species is primarily monogamous and offer evidence to the contrary. They argue, for example, that our sexual dimorphism, testicle size, female copulatory vocalization, appetite for sexual novelty, various cultural practices, and hidden female ovulation, among other factors strongly suggest a non-monogamous, non-polygynous history. The authors argue that mate selection among pre-agricultural humans was not the subject of intragroup competition as sex was neither scarce nor commodified. Rather, sperm competition was a more important paternity factor than sexual selection. This behavior survives among some remaining hunter-forager groups that believe in partible paternity.

The authors argue as a result that conventional wisdom regarding human nature, as well as what they call the standard narrative of evolutionary psychology, is wrong. Their version of the "standard narrative" goes like this: Males and females assess the value of mates from perspectives based upon their differing reproductive agendas/capacities. According to the authors:

"[The male] looks for signs of youth, fertility, health, absence of previous sexual experience, and likelihood of future sexual fidelity. In other words, his assessment is skewed toward finding a fertile, healthy young mate with many childbearing years ahead and no current children to drain his resources. She looks for signs of wealth (or at least prospects of future wealth), social status, physical health, and likelihood that he will stick around to protect and provide for their children. Her guy must be willing and able to provide materially for her (especially during pregnancy and breastfeeding) and their children (known as male parental investment)."

Assuming the male and female meet each other's criteria, they mate and form a monogamous pair bond. Following this

"she will be sensitive to indications that he is considering leaving (vigilant toward signs of infidelity involving intimacy with other women that would threaten her access to his resources and protection)—while keeping an eye out (around ovulation, especially) for a quick fling with a man genetically superior to her husband. He will be sensitive to signs of her sexual infidelities (which would reduce his all-important paternity certainty)—while taking advantage of short-term sexual opportunities with other women (as his sperm are easily produced and plentiful)."

In human mating behavior, the authors state that "we don't see [current mating behaviors] as elements of human nature so much as adaptations to social conditions—many of which were introduced with the advent of agriculture no more than ten thousand years ago."

The authors take a broad position that goes beyond sexual behavior, arguing that humans are generally more egalitarian and selfless than is often thought. In an interview, Ryan said, "So we're not saying that sharing was so widespread because everyone was loving and sitting around the fire singing "Kumbaya" every night. The reason that sharing was so widespread—and continues to be in the remaining hunter-gatherer societies in existence—is because it's simply the most efficient way of distributing risk among a group of people." However, the Neolithic Revolution led to the advent of private property and the accumulation of power and completely changed people's lifestyles. This change in lifestyle fundamentally altered the way people behave and has left modern humans in a situation where their instincts are at odds with the societies in which they live.

The authors do not take an explicit position in the book regarding the morality or desirability of monogamy or alternative sexual behavior in modern society but argue that people should be made aware of our behavioral history so that they can make better-informed choices.

== Reception ==
=== Popular media reception ===
About six weeks after publication, Sex at Dawn debuted on The New York Times best-seller list at #24 and last appeared there as #33 three weeks later.

Despite significant academic criticism of the research, reasoning, and conclusions of Sex at Dawn, the book received praise from many non-academic reviewers in the media. The book was praised by syndicated sex-advice columnist Dan Savage, who wrote: "Sex At Dawn is the single most important book about human sexuality since Alfred Kinsey unleashed Sexual Behavior in the Human Male on the American public in 1948." Newsweek's Kate Daily wrote, "This book takes a swing at pretty much every big idea on human nature: that poverty is an inevitable consequence of life on earth, that mankind is by nature brutish, and, most important, that humans evolved to be monogamous. ... [Sex at Dawn] sets out to destroy almost each and every notion of the discipline, turning the field on its head and taking down a few big names in science in the process. ... Funny, witty, and light ... the book is a scandal in the best sense, one that will have you reading the best parts aloud and reassessing your ideas about humanity's basic urges well after the book is done... Ryan and Jethá do an admirable job of poking holes in the prevailing evo-psych theories and are more apt to turn to biological, rather than psychological, evidence. That doesn’t mean their thesis is bulletproof. But it does mean there’s a lot of value in reconsidering basic assumptions about our beginnings that we widely accept today as gospel."

Sex at Dawn: was chosen as NPR host Peter Sagal's favorite book of 2010.

Science blogger Kevin Bonham also responded favorably to the book. He called the argument of Ryan and Jethá that "pre-agrarian human societies were exceedingly promiscuous" a "convincing" and well-documented one. However, Bonham cautioned his readers that "I can’t be certain that the authors aren’t cherry-picking examples that support their conclusions."

Megan McArdle of The Atlantic criticized the book on her blog. She stated: "it reads like an undergraduate thesis—cherry-picked evidence stretched far out of shape to support their theory. The language is breathless rather than scientific, and they don't even attempt to paper over the enormous holes in their theory that people are naturally polyamorous."

=== Scholarly reception ===
In contrast to the popular media reception, scholars and academics have overwhelmingly reviewed Sex at Dawn negatively (see references following). Ryan self-reports that he originally tried to publish the book with academic publisher Oxford University Press, but it was rejected there after failing its peer review process. Those responding negatively have been critical both of the book's methodology, and its conclusions, and have included those with established expertise in anthropology, primatology, biology, sexology, and evolutionary psychology (i.e., disciplines related to the book); their comments have appeared in book reviews, peer-reviewed academic journals, articles in the popular press, as well as in self-published blogs (see following).

==== Negative critiques ====
The book was criticized for its alleged "biased reporting of data, theoretical and evidentiary shortcomings, and problematic assumptions" in a pair of book reviews by anthropologist Ryan Ellsworth. Writing in the peer-reviewed journal Evolutionary Psychology, Ellsworth argues that the book misrepresents the state of current research on sexual behavior. Ellsworth argues that while promiscuity has certainly been part of human behavior, it is "doubtful that this is because we are promiscuous at heart (this may apply to the behavior of most women more than the desire of most men), shackled by the trappings of a post-agricultural dilemma of our own devices, unable to return to the ancestral days of sexual communism." Noting that he could find no previous academic reviews of Sex at Dawn, Ellsworth suggests that the book's positive reception in popular media will project "a distorted portrayal of current theory and evidence on evolved human sexuality" to the general public. Ellsworth and colleagues also note that contrary to what is argued in Sex at Dawn, "the existence of partible paternity in some societies does not prove that humans are naturally promiscuous any more so than the existence of monogamy in some societies proves that humans are naturally monogamous".

Ryan argues that although Ellsworth makes some valid points, he misunderstood his and Jethá's central argument. According to Ryan, they did not argue that human sexuality was the same as bonobo sexuality; but rather that coitus was more frequent than is generally acknowledged, and that a typical human being would have had multiple partners within relatively short periods of time (i.e. each estrus cycle of a female). He argues that the main point of the book is to discredit "the standard narrative." He thinks reviewers read too much into the book, which merely seeks to challenge monogamy, rather than categorically reject it in favor of an alternative relationship model.

In 2012, evolutionary biologist Lynn Saxon released Sex at Dusk, a rebuttal to Dawn which relies predominantly on the exact same sources; identifying several research errors and instances of quote mining made throughout the latter. Saxon criticizes Dawn for being "almost all about sex and not much about children, [even though] evolution is very much about reproduction—variation in reproductive success is evolution," and argues that the book fundamentally misunderstands both sexual and natural selection. In particular, Saxon refutes Ryan and Jethá's argument that prehistoric males were unconcerned with paternity, because genes that do not ensure their own propagation cannot be selected for, and explains that in every 'partible paternity' society which the authors cite, mate-guarding practices like pair-bonding, sexual jealousy, punishments for infidelity or promiscuity, and paternity-related infanticide are all commonplace. She also argues that Dawn misinterprets the social and sexual behavior of bonobos, and that the authors had erroneously conflated absolute monogamy (committing to one's first sexual partner for life) with relative (e.g., serial) monogamy. Finally, Saxon further accuses Ryan and Jethá of calling for an "equalization of male access to women and [a] removal of conscious female mate choices," highlighting that—for all their theorizing that prehistoric women were less sexually discriminate than contemporary women—the authors at no point argue that ancestral men were any different from contemporary men in their sexual preferences:

"It would appear, according to Ryan and Jethá, that only female and not male sexual preferences are social constructs. ... Women at no point are argued as all being equally attractive to men, and the authors’ discussion of women’s bodies and sexual signals strongly suggests that they do recognize that men have quite strong mate preferences for young, fertile, and attractive women. ... [This is made more disturbing by] their 'evidence' that women's bodies want a lot more sex than their minds want. A belief in a repressed, natural female desire for sex with all-comers, and the potential removal of a woman's right to have her "no" taken seriously, is obviously a serious, and potentially very dangerous, error. ... As soon as we [acknowledge] any (male or female) sexual preferences, as will inevitably happen in the real world, we are then faced with sexual rejection, jealousies and competition which the authors deny existed in our prehistory."

Saxon ultimately denounces Ryan and Jethá's argument as "a contemporary middle-class, child-free, sex-obsessed, male fantasy projected back onto prehistory. It may increasingly become our present, but it certainly isn't our human past. And "recreational sex" is not what creates the future." In a Chronicle of Higher Education review, David Barash—co-author of The Myth of Monogamy: Fidelity and Infidelity in Animals and People—wrote approvingly of Dusk, stating that Ryan and Jethá "ignore and/or misrepresent reams of anthropology and biology in their eagerness to make a brief for some sort of Rousseau-ian sexual idyll that exists—and/or existed—only in their overheated libidinous imaginations."

Evolutionary psychologist Diana Fleischman—an advocate of polyamory—has criticized Sex at Dawn, arguing that its critiques of normative monogamy and evolutionary psychology are overreaching; to the point of strongly misrepresenting evolutionary theory and history. Psychologist Steven Pinker similarly referred to the book as "pseudoscience" in a tweet, with Pinker and Fleischman both recommending Dusk (see above) as a more scientifically-accurate alternative.

Herbert Gintis, economist and evolutionary scholar, wrote in a review for Amazon.com that, although the authors' conclusions are "usually not far from the truth, ...Ryan and Jethá justify their position mostly [with] anecdotal and unsystematic anthropological evidence, and the authors have no anthropological credentials." Gintis critiques the idea that human males were unconcerned with parentage, "which would make us unlike any other species I can think of" and suggests that the authors' characterization of prehistoric human warfare is incorrect.

Some reviews argue that Ryan and Jethá set up a strawman argument with the "standard narrative." Both Gintis and sexuality scholar Emily Nagoski argue there is no "standard narrative" in modern scientific literature, with Nagoski in particular accusing Ryan and Jethá of bulverism: "At no point does the book even attempt to convince me that this is the narrative; it simply asserts that it is so and moves on. As a person who has read a great deal of the science they cite, I can tell you that among scientists, S@D’s narrative is not remotely 'standard.' I could buy the argument that it is a CULTURAL narrative, and if that were the claim the authors were making, a great deal of my struggles with the book would be resolved." Nagoski agrees with many of the book's criticisms of evolutionary psychology and the authors' thesis "that monogamy is not the innate sociosexual system of humans," but states that "they come to the wrong conclusion about the nature of human sexuality" due to errors of reasoning and understanding of evolutionary science. Nagoski ultimately concluded that the book was "sloppily reasoned, contemptuous, and ignorant."

Biologist Alan Dixson also disputed key arguments about monogamy in Sex at Dawn.

Anthropologist Peter B. Gray and Justin R. Garcia dismissed Sex at Dawn in Evolution and Human Sexual Behavior (2013), writing that it was misleading and that the evidence did not support Ryan and Jetha's views.

Evolutionary psychologists Peter K. Jonason and Rhonda Nicole Balzarini criticize the book for committing the naturalistic fallacy, getting the evolutionary history of humans wrong, ignoring selection occurring at the level of individuals/genes and instead assuming group selection.

Psychologist and social theorist William von Hippel characterized the central argument of the book as "bullshit" and highly questionable among him and his peers.

==== Positive critiques ====
The book received the 2011 Ira and Harriet Reiss Theory Award from the Society for the Scientific Study of Sexuality.

Some reviews praise the book for confronting established theories of evolutionary psychology. For example, anthropology professor Barbara J. King wrote "...lapses do mar more than one passage in the book. Yet on balance, Sex at Dawn is a welcome marriage of data from social science, animal behavior, and neuroscience."

Eric Michael Johnson, a graduate student in the history of science and primatology, credits Ryan and Jethá for advancing their argument using evidence not available to its previous advocates and doing so using a "relaxed writing style and numerous examples from modern popular culture." Johnson wrote that the authors' conclusion, far from being completely novel and unsupported, had been advocated by a minority of psychologists and anthropologists for decades. As examples, Johnson cites Sarah Hrdy, David P. Barash, and Judith Lipton. Sarah Blaffer Hrdy, an American anthropologist and primatologist, "advocated a promiscuous mating system for humans in 1999 in The Woman That Never Evolved. According to Johnson, psychologist David P. Barash and psychiatrist Judith Lipton presented similar arguments in 2001.

However, Barash has also criticized Sex at Dawn, stating:

Sex at Dawn has been taken as scientifically valid by large numbers of naïve readers … whereas it is an intellectually myopic, ideologically driven, pseudo-scientific fraud.
