= Passage (Morley novel) =

2007 novel by John David Morley

- First edition
- Author: John David Morley
- Language: English
- Genre: Fiction, Historical, Picaresque, Philosophical
- Publisher: Max Press
- Publication date: 2007
- Media type: Print (Hardback & Paperback)
- Pages: 393 pp
- ISBN: 1906251002

Passage (2007) is a historical novel by John David Morley, the story of one man's journey through five centuries of existence in the New World.

== Summary ==
Abducted by conquistadors in the year 1500, the merchant's ward Pablito (alias White Water Bird, alias Paul Zarraté, alias Paul Straight, alias "the World’s Greatest Living Wonder") passes through five books and five ages of man, as he travels from the primordial forests of the Amazon to the Incan empire of Tahuantin-Suyu, to the slave-plantations of colonial Pernambuco, via antebellum New Orleans, to the 1893 Chicago World's Fair, before witnessing the birth of Hollywood and the explosion of an atomic bomb.

== Reception ==
"The testimony of this decelerated man makes for a long, luxuriantly detailed read," Charles Fernyhough noted in The Sunday Telegraph. "This sweeping but pacey 'palimpsest' of a novel wraps up the past of an entire hemisphere in one mesmerising voice," declared Boyd Tonkin in The Independent. “Funny, depressing, optimistic, bleak, fantastic, mundane: John David Morley's remarkable new novel is all of these, often in the space of a single paragraph,” wrote James Porteous in The Herald: "Morley's themes of time, memory, sleep, death, religion, myth and longevity evoke Borges and Marquez and their mixture of magic and mundane. At its best, the book bears comparison with those masters." The critic Frank Kermode hailed Passage as "a remarkable feat of imagination and sheer narrative energy, the apotheosis of the picaro."

== In translation ==
In 2011, Passage was published in Spanish as La Noche Será Larga in a translation by Claudia Conde.
