= Parenting for Everyone =

Book by Simon Soloveychik

Parenting For Everyone (Педагогика для всех; Pedagogika dlya vseh) is a book by Simon Soloveychik on parenting which discusses the goals, conditions and means of upbringing. It continues by going into detail about upbringing the heart, spirit and intelligence of a child through communication, cooperation, and co-creativity.

The basic premise of the book is that the "foundation of the good life of a man is being conscientious and kind." The|author believed that kindness is the key to raising good children. According to the author there must be at least one person in a child's life who sets a good example for a child, showing kindness to the child. What matters most is that someone in the child's life "sincerely and deeply, and without hesitation believes in kindness and honesty, or in love and conscience".

Soloveychik asserts that raising a kind child is done by allowing the child to be kind. People teach children about freedom by letting them be free, teach responsibility by letting them be responsible, teach goodness and conscience through goodness and conscience, and people teach children to be happy by being happy, because 'we raise not a child but a man".

Three major precepts are raised repeatedly in the book: truth, goodness and beauty. The author writes that the truth is that there is a definite line between good and evil; people generally know this and accept it. This knowing and acceptance is called intelligence. For a child/man to be a complete human means that person's heart, spirit, and intelligence needs to be developed. The truth about a man, the author asserts, is that man is created for goodness, for infinitely increasing dignity, and people are free when they learn the truth about themselves.
