= Journey to the End of the Whale =

2005 novel by John David Morley

- First edition
- Author: John David Morley
- Language: English
- Genre: Fiction, adventure, travel literature, philosophical
- Publisher: Weidenfeld & Nicolson
- Publication date: 2005
- Media type: Print (hardback & paperback)
- Pages: 250 pp (hardback)
- ISBN: 0-297-84848-8

Journey to the End of the Whale (2005) is a novel by John David Morley.

== Summary ==
Swiss orphan, insurance agent and amateur marine biologist Daniel Serraz free-floats with life's currents until a traumatic midlife episode sends him on a journey of discovery to the remote east Indonesian island of Lefó. There, he will uncover the secret of his origins, but not before risking everything hunting with the islanders, the last torchbearers of an ancient tradition by which whales are bested by men in teak boats, harpooned by hand on the open sea.

== Reception ==
Writing in The Observer, novelist and critic Adam Mars-Jones described the book as “a paean to the majesty, complexity and otherness of the world's whales; and an elegy for a way of life which depended on killing them.” In The Sunday Telegraph, Matthew Alexander wrote:

"It is impossible to do justice in this space to the rich spiritual-thematic explorations which Morley produces... The whale legends and ancient traditions of the islands, the submarine lives of giant mammals connected by sound-telepathy across vast tracts of ocean, the giant whale-stone which overhangs the bay in Lefó; from these and many more images and experiences emerges a poignant kind of personal spirituality which leads Daniel to a new understanding of his own humanity."

"A marvellous and original work of fiction, which has not quite received all of the recognition it deserves" was the verdict of novelist and broadcaster Melvyn Bragg, who chose Journey to the End of the Whale as one of his 'Books of the year' in The Observer. In The Observer magazine, Joe Holden concluded simply: “If ever a writer put his heart into a book, it is John David Morley.”

Journey to the End of the Whale was shortlisted for the 2006 Commonwealth Writers' Prize in the Eurasia section.

== In translation ==
In 2007, the novel was published in Spanish as Viaje al fin de las Ballenas in a translation by Mercedes Fernández Cuesta and Mario Grande.
