= The Myth of Monogamy =

The Myth of Monogamy: Fidelity and Infidelity in Animals and People
- Author: David P. Barash and Judith Eve Lipton
- Language: English
- Subject: Human sexuality
- Publication date: 2001
- Publication place: United States
- Media type: Print

The Myth of Monogamy: Fidelity and Infidelity in Animals and People is a 2001 book by psychologist David P. Barash and psychiatrist Judith Eve Lipton.

== Summary ==
The titular "myth of monogamy" alludes to the popular belief that most animal species are naturally monogamous, and that lifelong monogamous marriages have been the norm for most human beings and societies. Barash and Lipton explain that monogamy (and absolute monogamy–lifelong commitment to one's first sexual partner–in particular) is rarely found in nature, and that polygyny—wherein a single male will mate with several different females—has been the norm for most human societies since at least as far back as the Neolithic Revolution. This is accounting for practices like concubinage, polygamy and related phenomena such as the Coolidge effect. In comparing the sexual behavior of humans with that of other animals, Barash and Lipton argue that monogamy only tends to form among species with high levels of Parental investment (e.g., humans and birds have especially vulnerable offspring which require more protection and resources than can easily be provided by a single, maternal parent). However, the authors also argue that infidelity remains common among humans and animals alike, for various reasons such as dual-mating among females and increasing reproductive success among males. For this reason, infidelity and polygamy are especially common in societies with high Social stratification, wherein powerful males may take multiple wives and women may pursue more discrete sexual relations with more romantically desirable partners.
