= The Book of Opposites =

2010 novel by John David Morley

- First Edition
- Author: John David Morley
- Language: English
- Genre: Fiction, Mystery, Philosophical
- Publisher: Max Press
- Publication date: 2007
- Media type: Print (Paperback)
- Pages: 208 pp
- ISBN: 1-906251-07-X

The Book of Opposites (2010) is a novel by John David Morley, a love story set in Berlin in the aftermath of the fall of the Wall.

== Summary ==
Beginning with a Mercedes 600 plunging off the Glienicker Bridge between the former borders of East and West, The Book of Opposites is a tale of love, death, precognition, paradox, yoga and quantum mechanics.

== Reception ==
“This is a bold and fascinating mystery novel of ideas", said Ian McEwan of the book in advance of its publication. "John David Morley enfolds science and human loss with great fictional cunning."
