= John David Morley =

English writer and novelist (1948–2018)

JDV Morley
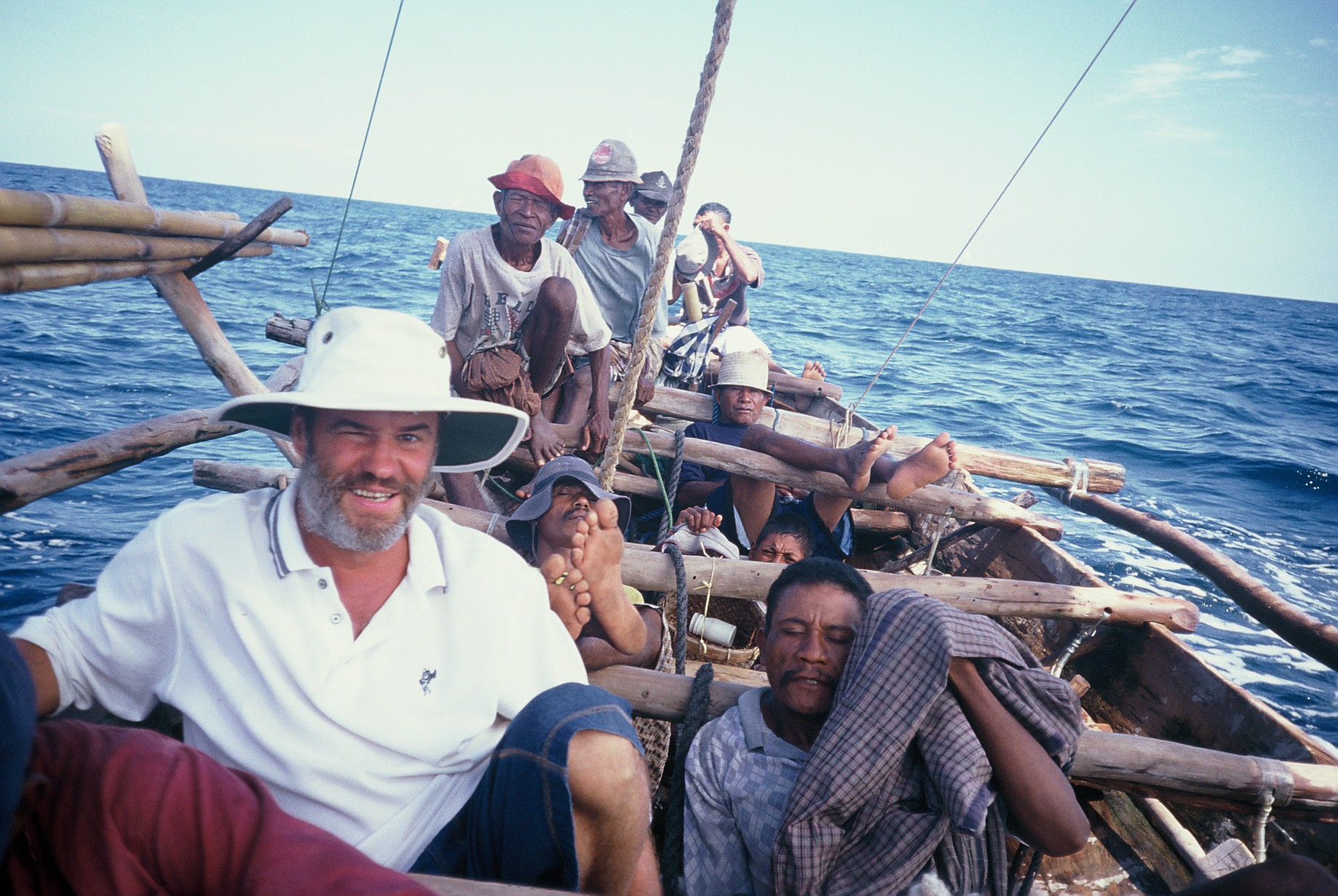
- JDV Morley in seas off Lamalera, 2002
- Born: 21 January 1948; Singapore
- Died: 18 February 2018 (aged 70); Munich, Germany
- Occupation: Novelist
- Writing career
- Genres: Fiction, Philosophical, Travel literature
- Notable works: Pictures from the Water Trade (1985), In The Labyrinth (1986), The Case of Thomas N. (1987), The Feast of Fools (1994), The Anatomy Lesson (1995), Destiny, or The Attraction of Affinities (1996), Journey to the End of the Whale (2005), Passage (2007), The Book of Opposites (2010), Ella Morris (2014)

John David Victor Morley (21 January 1948 – 18 February 2018) was an English writer and novelist.

== Early life ==
The third and youngest child of the artist and sculptor Patricia Morley (née Booth) and John Arthur Elwell Morley, a District Officer in the British Colonial Service, John David Victor Morley was born "in something of a hurry on a bench in a third-class Chinese ward at the Kandang Kerbau Maternity Hospital" in Singapore. He grew up speaking Malay amid an extended household of Malays, Javanese, Chinese and Indians, later commemorated by his parents in their memoirs.

At three, Morley experienced a formative culture shock upon the family's relocation from tropical Malaya to England, before spending two years on Africa's Gold Coast where his father was helping to administrate the transition from British colonial rule in soon-to-be independent Ghana. Parts of the story of his early life are told in his father's book Colonial Postscript (1992). Educated at St George's School, Windsor, and Clifton College, Morley graduated from Merton College, Oxford, with a degree in English Language and Literature in 1969. Later the same year he left England for Munich, Germany.

== Career ==
While working as a stage-hand at Munich's Kammerspiele in 1969, Morley received a call from a family friend, Nevill Coghill, asking whether he wished to spend the coming months at the Puerto Vallarta, Mexico residence of Elizabeth Taylor and Richard Burton, as tutor to Taylor's son Christopher Wilding. Morley would later recount his friendship with Burton and Taylor in a tribute published in Vanity Fair in December 1984, the year that Burton died.

In 1973, Morley was awarded a three-year scholarship by the Japanese Ministry of Culture to study at the Language Research Institute of Waseda University in Tokyo. His stay in Japan would form the basis of his first published book, the fictionalised memoir Pictures from the Water Trade. A New York Times Book Review notable book which also featured in Time Magazine's list of the "Best of '85", the novel was translated into half a dozen languages and became a bestseller in Japan.

From 1979-2000 Morley worked as a researcher and interpreter for the Japanese Broadcasting Corporation (NHK), as a freelance journalist for publications including The New York Times Book Review, The Times, The Sunday Times Magazine, The Observer and Condé Nast Traveler, and as a correspondent for the short-lived Asia Times. During the 1990s, he wrote op-ed pieces in German for the feuilleton of the Süddeutsche Zeitung.

Morley published one collection of journalism and ten works of fiction, of which the last, Ella Morris, appeared in September 2014. Morley's papers are collected at Boston University's Howard Gotlieb Archival Research Center. He died on Sunday, 18 February 2018, aged 70.

== Bibliography ==
=== Novels ===
- Pictures from the Water Trade (1985)
- In the Labyrinth (1986)
- The Case of Thomas N. (1987)
- The Feast of Fools (1994)
- The Anatomy Lesson (1995)
- Destiny, or The Attraction of Affinities (1996)
- East of the Sun and West of the Moon (2001)
- Journey to the End of the Whale (2005)
- Passage (2007)
- The Book of Opposites (2010)
- Ella Morris (2014)

=== Journalism ===
- Encounters (1990)

== Themes ==
Morley's novels revolve around themes of love, loss, the quest for identity and the journey into the unknown. Almost, if not all, involve a protagonist's assimilation into an unfamiliar culture, be it Japan in Pictures from the Water Trade, the unnamed city in The Case of Thomas N., the indigenous whaling-village in Journey to the End of the Whale, the literal New World of Passage, or the East German experience of the newly united Berlin in The Book of Opposites.

=== Identity ===
In a 1987 profile in The Guardian, on the publication of The Case of Thomas N., Hugh Hebert singled out the identity issue. "Thomas N. never uses the word 'I', and that disappearance of the personal pronoun is also an important thread in Morley's essay on the Japanese language," Hebert noted of a theme common to Morley's first three books. "In the Japanese book, Morley wrote in the third person, calling his young Englishman Boon. In the Labyrinth suddenly, a third of the way through, turned into a first person narrative – Morley went back and wrote it all as 'I'. Thomas N. is a youth without qualities, a large zero in which the people around can write their own ideas."

"Morley is an immigrant of the imagination" observed Richard Eder in his review of The Feast of Fools in The Los Angeles Times Book Review: "His cityscape, his celebrations, his meals, his very weather and noises are German. Yet his principal characters mount their national ladders into a universality that is sweetly particular." Frank Kermode echoed Eder's notion in his tribute to Morley's Passage twelve years later: "A remarkable feat of imagination and sheer narrative energy. What Morley has achieved is the apotheosis of the picaro. The old style picaresque confined the hero to a single lifetime; Morley has burst free of such constraints and deals in centuries, with corresponding geographic advantages."

=== Humanism ===
Informed by the specter of the post-war years and the era of division in Germany, the unnerving bleakness of certain of Morley's earlier books (the stark prison sequences of In the Labyrinth, for example, or the disturbingly ambiguous coda of The Case of Thomas N.) gives way, over the course of his body of work, to a more hopeful, even profoundly life-affirming vision of the nature of existence, as evidenced in his narrator's conjectural conclusions on cetacean physiology in Journey to the End of the Whale and on the cosmic implications of quantum mechanics in The Book of Opposites. Reviewing the former in The Sunday Telegraph, Matthew Alexander applauded the "rich spiritual-thematic explorations" of the book: "The whale legends and ancient traditions of the islands, the submarine lives of giant mammals connected by sound-telepathy across vast tracts of ocean... from these and many more images and experiences emerges a poignant kind of personal spirituality which leads Daniel to a new understanding of his own humanity." As the author and translator Suzanne Ruta noted in The New York Times Book Review of The Feast of Fools: "Morley writes less as a moralist than as a celebrant."

=== Love Triangles & Telepathic Lovers ===
At least half of Morley's novels involve a love triangle, more commonly between two men and one woman (though in the Pernambuco, Brazil sequence of Passage this template is reversed). Yet, in contrast to the love triangle of The Feast of Fools, in which the male lovers' rivalry reaches comically ludicrous proportions (ultimately culminating, as Andy Solomon wrote in The Chicago Tribune, "with an excremental duel that would fall beneath the dignity of the grossest Animal House on any college campus"), those in The Anatomy Lesson, Destiny, or The Attraction of Affinities and, most especially, The Book of Opposites are emblematic of unusually happy, tender interminglings between three human beings united by mutual affection. "Morley’s observing eye," wrote Christina Patterson in The Times Literary Supplement, "though unfailingly cool, is capable of both wit and compassion and he has a good understanding of 'that inequality which is in the nature of love', writing movingly of the tension between life and death, joy and pain."

Telepathy between lovers is also a common feature of Morley's works, notably in Journey to the End of the Whale, in which Daniel's wife Kozue instinctively knows that he is near death, despite his being on the other side of the world at the time, via a mental connection seemingly akin to that of whales echolocating in the deep. This trope attains a new dimension, though, in The Book of Opposites within the tripartite love affair between the "drifter" and sometime physicist Frank, the photographer Wilma Pfrumpter, whose peculiar gift of precognition results in an early career as a remote viewer, and her husband Pfrumpy, whose training in Tibetan Buddhism, in part, holds the key to the mystery of why their car flew off the Glienicker Bridge. The largely anonymous narrator of the novel, who styles himself the "observer", even intuits a possible scientific raison d’etre for this phenomenon of lovers' telepathy in evidence supporting the existence of quantum entanglement.

=== Writing as 'highwire act' ===
The idea of writing involving a restive, dangerous commitment on the part of the writer is apparent in Morley's work. Any catharsis found in the act of storytelling seems linked to the inherent risks involved, as evidenced by Boon's descriptions of shodo in Pictures from the Water Trade, specifically in his comparison of the art of Japanese calligraphy to the violence of sumo or the ritual act of seppuku:

When Boon knelt on the tatami in his cold bare room (for some reason the cold had a beneficial effect on shodo) and began to prepare for his calligraphical exercises, images of the ritual performance of seppuku would spontaneously come to his mind. Tense, a little excited, like a coiled spring, he mentally went through the motions of the strokes he intended to put down on paper, waiting until he was sure what we wanted and for the moment when he could do it. Now – and without thinking that he had already made up his mind to begin he found the brush suddenly dropping down onto the paper, almost of its own accord. The tip of the brush struck the paper with a slight jar. With a sense of shock he watched it cut a dense black swathe on the blank paper, irreversibly, he could no longer draw back. His pent feelings were released and began to flow down the page in the wake of the glossy ink.

Described in a 2005 profile in The Observer magazine as a man defined "by his compulsion to ride his adrenaline", Morley, on several occasions, came close to death while discovering his fiction. Indeed, when asked by The Observer's reporter "if he started out with nine lives, how many does he think he has left?", Morley answered: "Four". His numerous close calls included a 1973 skiing accident (in which he broke both legs, suffered an embolism and was on life-support for a week), a 1995 bout of malaria tropica in Burma and Thailand, a near-drowning in a local lake in Munich in 2001 on account of a stenosis of the aorta, and two subsequent experiences of open heart surgery, the latter an emergency operation conducted by a doctor who declared his patient to be "a medical miracle". "When I sit down and get seriously into a book, my pulse rate rises considerably," Morley once said. "You cannot live a safe life and an interesting one in this profession. Writing is a frightening business."
