= Evolutionary ethics =

Study of evolution on morality or ethics

Evolutionary ethics is a field of inquiry that explores how evolutionary theory might bear on our understanding of ethics or morality. The range of issues investigated by evolutionary ethics is quite broad. Supporters of evolutionary ethics have argued that it has important implications in the fields of descriptive ethics, normative ethics, and metaethics.

Descriptive evolutionary ethics consists of biological approaches to morality based on the alleged role of evolution in shaping human psychology and behavior. Such approaches may be based in scientific fields such as evolutionary psychology, sociobiology, or ethology, and seek to explain certain human moral behaviors, capacities, and tendencies in evolutionary terms. For example, the nearly universal belief that incest is morally wrong might be explained as an evolutionary adaptation that furthered human survival.

Normative (or prescriptive) evolutionary ethics, by contrast, seeks not to explain moral behavior, but to justify or debunk certain normative ethical theories or claims. For instance, some proponents of normative evolutionary ethics have argued that evolutionary theory undermines certain widely held views of humans' moral superiority over other animals.

Evolutionary metaethics asks how evolutionary theory bears on theories of ethical discourse, the question of whether objective moral values exist, and the possibility of objective moral knowledge. For example, some evolutionary ethicists have appealed to evolutionary theory to defend various forms of moral anti-realism (the claim, roughly, that objective moral facts do not exist) and moral skepticism.

== History ==
The first notable attempt to explore links between evolution and ethics was made by Charles Darwin in The Descent of Man (1871). In Chapters IV and V of that work Darwin set out to explain the origin of human morality in order to show that there was no absolute gap between man and animals. Darwin sought to show how a refined moral sense, or conscience, could have developed through a natural evolutionary process that began with social instincts rooted in our nature as social animals.

Not long after the publication of Darwin's The Descent of Man, evolutionary ethics took a very different—and far more dubious—turn in the form of Social Darwinism. Leading Social Darwinists such as Herbert Spencer and William Graham Sumner sought to apply the lessons of biological evolution to social and political life. Just as in nature, they claimed, progress occurs through a ruthless process of competitive struggle and "survival of the fittest," so human progress will occur only if government allows unrestricted business competition and makes no effort to protect the "weak" or "unfit" by means of social welfare laws. Critics such as Thomas Henry Huxley, G. E. Moore, William James, Charles Sanders Peirce, and John Dewey roundly criticized such attempts to draw ethical and political lessons from Darwinism, and by the early decades of the twentieth century Social Darwinism was widely viewed as discredited.

The modern revival of evolutionary ethics owes much to E. O. Wilson's 1975 book, Sociobiology: The New Synthesis. In that work, Wilson argues that there is a genetic basis for a wide variety of human and nonhuman social behaviors.

More recently, a number of evolutionary biologists, including Richard Alexander, Robert Trivers, and George Williams, have argued for a different relation between ethics and evolution. In Alexander's words: “Ethical questions, and the study of morality or concepts of justice and right and wrong, derive solely from the existence of conflicts of interest.” The latter, in turn, are inevitable consequences of genetic individuality. Alexander argued that "Because morality involves conflicts of interest, it cannot easily be generalized into a universal despite virtually continual efforts by utilitarian philosophers to do that; morality does not derive its meaning from sets of universals or undeniable facts." Rather, he argued,

The two major contributions that evolutionary biology may be able to make to this problem are, first, to justify and promote the conscious realization that it is conflicts of interest concentrated at the individual level which lead to ethical questions, and, second, to help identify the nature and intensity of the conflicts of interest involved in specific cases.

This view runs contrary to that of the majority of philosophers who work on evolutionary ethics, since it denies the existence of an innate “moral sense” in humans.

As an example of genetic conflict, parents are selected to direct their time and resources equally among their offspring, but any particular child is more strongly related to itself than to any of its siblings, and so will desire a greater amount of parental investment than either parent is selected to give. A consequence of this parent-offspring conflict is that natural selection is unable to instill a universal sense of what is "just" or "fair" with regard to treatment of siblings, since behavior that is most conducive to propagation of the parents' genes differs from what is most favorable for the child's genes.

Alexander noted that a focus on conflicts of interest is common among biologists and other non-philosophers, but that "many moral philosophers do not approach the problem of morality and ethics as if it arose as an effort to resolve conflicts of interests." He defined what he called "moral systems" as societal (not evolved) responses to conflicts of interest. Among other examples, he cited societal rules or laws imposing monogamy. The behavioral conflicts that are addressed by such rules have their evolutionary origin in the (genetic) sexual conflict between men and women.

== Descriptive evolutionary ethics ==
The most widely accepted form of evolutionary ethics is descriptive evolutionary ethics. Descriptive evolutionary ethics seeks to explain various kinds of moral phenomena wholly or partly in genetic terms. Ethical topics addressed include altruistic behaviors, conservation ethics, an innate sense of fairness, a capacity for normative guidance, feelings of kindness or love, self-sacrifice, incest-avoidance, parental care, in-group loyalty, monogamy, feelings related to competitiveness and retribution, moral "cheating," and hypocrisy.

A key issue in evolutionary psychology has been how altruistic feelings and behaviors could have evolved, in both humans and nonhumans, when the process of natural selection is based on the multiplication over time only of those genes that adapt better to changes in the environment of the species. Theories addressing this have included kin selection, group selection, and reciprocal altruism (both direct and indirect, and on a society-wide scale). Descriptive evolutionary ethicists have also debated whether various types of moral phenomena should be seen as adaptations which have evolved because of their direct adaptive benefits, or spin-offs that evolved as side-effects of adaptive behaviors.

== Normative evolutionary ethics ==
Normative evolutionary ethics is the most controversial branch of evolutionary ethics. Normative evolutionary ethics aims at defining which acts are right or wrong, and which things are good or bad, in evolutionary terms. It is not merely describing, but it is prescribing goals, values and obligations. Social Darwinism, discussed above, is the most historically influential version of normative evolutionary ethics. As philosopher G. E. Moore famously argued, many early versions of normative evolutionary ethics seemed to commit a logical mistake that Moore dubbed the naturalistic fallacy. This was the mistake of defining a normative property, such as goodness, in terms of some non-normative, naturalistic property, such as pleasure or survival.

More sophisticated forms of normative evolutionary ethics need not commit either the naturalistic fallacy or the is-ought fallacy. But all varieties of normative evolutionary ethics face the difficult challenge of explaining how evolutionary facts can have normative authority for rational agents. "Regardless of why one has a given trait, the question for a rational agent is always: is it right for me to exercise it, or should I instead renounce and resist it as far as I am able?"

== Evolutionary metaethics ==
Evolutionary theory may not be able to tell us what is morally right or wrong, but it might be able to illuminate our use of moral language, or to cast doubt on the existence of objective moral facts or the possibility of moral knowledge. Evolutionary ethicists such as Michael Ruse, E. O. Wilson, Richard Joyce, and Sharon Street have defended such claims.

Some philosophers who support evolutionary meta-ethics use it to undermine views of human well-being that rely upon Aristotelian teleology, or other goal-directed accounts of human flourishing. A number of thinkers have appealed to evolutionary theory in an attempt to debunk moral realism or support moral skepticism. Sharon Street is one prominent ethicist who argues that evolutionary psychology undercuts moral realism. According to Street, human moral decision-making is "thoroughly saturated" with evolutionary influences. Natural selection, she argues, would have rewarded moral dispositions that increased fitness, not ones that track moral truths, should they exist. It would be a remarkable and unlikely coincidence if "morally blind" ethical traits aimed solely at survival and reproduction aligned closely with independent moral truths. So we cannot be confident that our moral beliefs accurately track objective moral truth. Consequently, realism forces us to embrace moral skepticism. Such skepticism, Street claims, is implausible. So we should reject realism and instead embrace some antirealist view that allows for rationally justified moral beliefs.

Defenders of moral realism have offered two sorts of replies. One is to deny that evolved moral responses would likely diverge sharply from moral truth. According to David Copp, for example, evolution would favor moral responses that promote social peace, harmony, and cooperation. But such qualities are precisely those that lie at the core of any plausible theory of objective moral truth. So Street's alleged "dilemma"—deny evolution or embrace moral skepticism—is a false choice.

A second response to Street is to deny that morality is as "saturated" with evolutionary influences as Street claims. William Fitzpatrick, for instance, argues that "[e]ven if there is significant evolutionary influence on the content of many of our moral beliefs, it remains possible that many of our moral beliefs are arrived at partly (or in some cases wholly) through autonomous moral reflection and reasoning, just as with our mathematical, scientific and philosophical beliefs." The wide variability of moral codes, both across cultures and historical time periods, is difficult to explain if morality is as pervasively shaped by genetic factors as Street claims.

Another common argument evolutionary ethicists use to debunk moral realism is to claim that the success of evolutionary psychology in explaining human ethical responses makes the notion of moral truth "explanatorily superfluous." If we can fully explain, for example, why parents naturally love and care for their children in purely evolutionary terms, there is no need to invoke any "spooky" realist moral truths to do any explanatory work. Thus, for reasons of theoretical simplicity we should not posit the existence of such truths and, instead, should explain the widely held belief in objective moral truth as "an illusion fobbed off on us by our genes in order to get us to cooperate with one another (so that our genes survive)."

Combining Darwinism with moral realism does not lead to unacceptable results in epistemology. No two worlds, that are non-normatively identical, can differ normatively. The instantiation of normative properties is metaphysically possible in a world like ours. The phylogenetic adoption of moral sense does not deprive ethical norms of independent and objective truth-values. A parallel with general theoretical principles exists, which being unchangeable in themselves are discovered during an investigation. Ethical a priori cognition is vindicated to the extent to which other a priori knowledge is available. Scrutinizing similar situations, the developing mind pondered idealized models subject to definite laws. In social relation, mutually acceptable behavior was mastered. A cooperative solution in rivalry among competitors is presented by Nash equilibrium. This behavioral pattern is not conventional (metaphysically constructive) but represents an objective relation similar to that of force or momentum equilibrium in mechanics.

== See also ==
- Animal faith – Ritual behavior in non-humans
- Appeal to nature – Rhetorical tactic and potential fallacy
- Bioethics – Study of the ethical issues emerging from advances in biology and medicine
- Eugenics – Effort to improve purported human genetic quality
- Evolution of morality – Emergence of human moral behavior over the course of human evolution
- Game theory – Mathematical models of strategic interactions
- Pragmatic ethics § Moral ecology – Theory that morality evolves like an ecosystem
- Social Darwinism – Group of pseudoscientific theories and societal practices
- Universal Darwinism – Application of Darwinian theory to other fields
