= Discourse ethics =

Argument focused on ethics

Discourse ethics is a philosophical theory of morality, attempting to update Kantian ethics for modern egalitarian intuitions and social epistemology. The theory originated with German philosophers Jürgen Habermas and Karl-Otto Apel, and variations have been used by Frank Van Dun and Habermas' student Hans-Hermann Hoppe.

Kant extracted moral principles from the necessities forced upon a rational subject reflecting on the world. Habermas extracted moral principles from the necessities forced upon individuals engaged in the discursive justification of validity claims, from the inescapable presuppositions of communication and argumentation.

The simplest form of discourse ethics is Habermas' "Principle of Universalization", which holds that

a moral norm "is valid just in case the foreseeable consequences and side-effects of its general observance for the interests and value-orientations of each individual could be jointly accepted by all concerned without coercion."

Discourse ethics is a possible grounding for critical theory. In that context, it argues that immoral social ills arise through stymied discourse, wherein certain participants cannot or do not submit their views for rational deliberation.

It is also a possible approach to the management of science. That approach is primarily popular in Europe, in part because Europeans prefer rule-based social adaption to technological progress, whereas Americans prefer utilitarian approaches.

== Habermas and Apel ==
Habermas's discourse ethics attempts to explain the implications of communicative rationality to moral insight and social norms. It reformulates Kantian deontological ethics into the analysis of communicative structures. This means that it is an attempt to explain the universal and obligatory nature of morality as a consequence of certain universal obligations associated with successful communication.

It is also a cognitivist moral theory, which means it holds that moral norms can be justified like facts. Thus it is explicitly attempting to bridge the gap between the "is" and the "ought."

However, the entire project is undertaken as a rational reconstruction of moral insight. It claims only to reconstruct the implicit normative orientations that guide individuals and it claims to access these through an analysis of communication.

=== Public discourse ethics ===
Public discourse ethics consists of conversations about ideas in civic or community contexts marked by diversity of perspectives requiring thoughtful public engagement. This discourse is made up of differing insights that helps to shape the public's engagement with one another. This type of discourse is meant to protect and to promote the public good.

For public discourse ethics to be successful there must be an effective level of civility between people or persons involved (Freud: "Civilization began the first time an angry person cast a word instead of a rock"). At the same time, participants must be free to criticize each other's argumentation.

Public discourse ethics allows interlocutors to make ethical or normative demands on each other. The result should be "public accountability," a combination of three basic factors:

- a diversity of ideas,
- an engagement of public decision making, and finally
- a rational explanation for continuing or changing a common practice

=== Presupposition ===
In Habermas' theory, normative validity would certainly arise from an ideal public discourse. Habermas maintains that in fact it must also arise from any argumentative procedures in which participants achieve genuine agreement (see universal pragmatics). Thus moral strictures can be derived from everyday practices used to resolve issues concerning the legitimacy of actions and the validity of the norms governing interactions, which Habermas calls principle (D).

From principle (D), it follows that the presuppositions of argumentation would become important. These presuppositions were the kinds of idealization that individuals had to make in order for communication and argumentation to even begin. For example:

- The presupposition that participants in communicative exchange are using the same linguistic expressions in the same way
- The presupposition that no relevant argument is suppressed or excluded by the participants
- The presupposition that no force except that of the better argument is exerted
- The presupposition that all the participants are motivated only by a concern for the better argument

There were also presuppositions unique to discourse:

- The presupposition that everyone would agree to the universal validity of the claim thematized
- The presupposition that everyone capable of speech and action is entitled to participate, and everyone is equally entitled to introduce new topics or express attitudes needs or desires
- The presupposition that no validity claim is exempt in principle from critical evaluation in argumentation

These are all at the center of Habermas's moral theory.

=== Universalization ===
The presuppositions of communication express a universal obligation to maintain impartial judgment in discourse, which constrains all affected to adopt the perspectives of all others in the exchange of reasons. From this Habermas extracts the following principle of universalization (U), which is the condition every valid norm has to fulfill:

(U) All affected can accept the consequences and the side effects that [the norm's] general observance can be anticipated to have for the satisfaction of everyone's interests, and the consequences are preferred to those of known alternative possibilities for regulation. (Habermas, 1991:65)

This can be understood as the deep structure of all acceptable moral norms, and should not be confused with the principle of discourse ethics (D), which presupposes that norms exist that satisfy the conditions specified by (U).

(D) Only those norms can claim to be valid that meet (or could meet) with the approval of all affected in their capacity as participants in a practical discourse.

The implications of (U) and (D) are quite profound. (U) claims to be a rational reconstruction of the impartial moral point of view at the heart of all cognitivist moral theories. According to moral cognitivists (e.g. Kant, Rawls etc.), it is only from such a moral point of view that insight into the actual (quasi-factual) impersonal obligations of a general will can be gained, because this perspective relieves decisions from the inaccuracies of personal interests. Of course, Habermas's reconstruction is different because it is intersubjective. That is, Habermas (unlike Kant or Rawls) formulates the moral point of view as it arises out of the multiple perspectives of those affected by a norm under consideration. The moral point of view explicated in (U) is not the property of an individual subject but the property of a community of interlocutors, the results of a complex dialogical process of role taking and perspective exchanging. Furthermore, (U) is deduced from a rational reconstruction of the presupposition of communication, which downgrades the strong transcendentalism of Kantian ethics by establishing a foundation in inner-worldly processes of communication.

(D) on the other hand is a principle concerning the manner in which norms conforming to (U) must be justified through discourse. Again, Habermas takes the task of moral reflection out of the isolated individual's head and gives it to intersubjective processes of communication. What (D) proposes is that moral principles must be validated in actual discourse and that those to be affected by a norm must be able to participate in argumentation concerning its validity. No number of thought experiments can replace a communicative exchange with others regarding moral norms that will affect them. Moreover, this general prescription concerning the type of discourse necessary for the justification of moral norms opens the process of moral deliberation to the kind of learning that accompanies a fallibilistic orientation. (U) and (D) are catalysts for a moral learning process, which although fallible is not relative. The flesh and blood insights of participants in communicative exchange are refracted through the universal guidelines explicated from the deep structures of communication and argumentation. This spawns discourses with a rational trajectory, which are grounded in the particular circumstances of those involved but aimed at a universal moral validity.

=== Practical applications ===
The practical applications of discourse ethics have taken a significant turn after the publication of Habermas' book Between Facts and Norms (1992), where its application to democracy and the legislative process was substantially refined and expanded. Before this book, Habermas had left open the question of the various applications of discourse theory to almost any type of consensus oriented group ranging from highly visible political and governmental groups, such as Parliament in Great Britain and Congressional debate in the United States, and other consensus oriented activities as found in public and private institutions such as those supported on various international websites and Wikipedia.

== Libertarian variations ==
See also: Hans-Hermann Hoppe § Argumentation ethics

Hans-Hermann Hoppe, a student of Habermas, and the Belgian legal philosopher Frank Van Dun have developed versions of discourse or argumentation ethics that reach conclusions aligned with classical liberalism and anarcho-capitalism rather than the more egalitarian or social-democratic implications drawn by Habermas and Apel.

Hoppe's "argumentation ethics," first presented in a 1988 essay in the journal Liberty and elaborated in The Economics and Ethics of Private Property, starts from the same observation that certain norms are presupposed by the act of argumentation itself (the "a priori of communication and argumentation"). Hoppe contends that participation in argumentation presupposes the arguer's exclusive control over his or her body (self-ownership) and the prior appropriation of scarce resources necessary to sustain argumentation. Any attempt to deny these norms while arguing is claimed to involve a performative contradiction. From this, Hoppe derives the non-aggression principle and a defense of private property rights as the only norms consistent with the presuppositions of discourse.

Van Dun independently developed a related "ethics of dialogue" (or argumentation ethics) in the early 1980s. He argues that a rationally convincing account of law and rights must respect the presuppositions of dialogue and argumentation, leading to the conclusion that every natural person has an inalienable claim to life, liberty, and property - provided equivalent claims of others are respected. This framework supports libertarian conclusions about the nature of law and rejects coercive state interventions.

== See also ==
- Argumentation theory
- Foucault–Habermas debate
- Hans-Hermann Hoppe § Argumentation ethics
