= In the Labyrinth (novel) =

Book by John David Morley

- First edition (US)
- Author: John David Morley
- Language: English
- Genre: Fiction, Prison literature, Philosophical
- Publisher: André Deutsch, The Atlantic Monthly Press
- Publication date: 1986
- Media type: Print (Hardcover)
- Pages: 212 pp (US edition)
- ISBN: 0-233-97978-6 (UK) ISBN 0-87113-070-X (US)

In the Labyrinth (1986) is a novel by John David Morley.

== Summary ==
Based on months of taped conversation with its real-life protagonist, In the Labyrinth is the fictionalized memoir of Hungarian-born, German businessman Josef Pallehner who, due to bureaucratic inertia and his own guilty conscience, gets lost for six years in a maze of eastern Czechoslovak prisons in the wake of the Second World War.

== Reception ==
"Morley's calm yet moving narrative is a fine tribute to a man who endured six years in prison because he lived at a time and place when borders — and his citizenship — changed at the instigation of governments," wrote Elisabeth Anderson in The Times. "In the Labyrinth is marked by great elegance of style", Carolyn See commented in The Los Angeles Times Book Review: "It continues traditions set by Kafka’s In the Penal Colony and Cummings’ The Enormous Room." "The cumulative effect of reading John David Morley’s In The Labyrinth is heartbreak," declared Gillian Greenwood in The Times: "The dispassionate, observant tone of the book gives great power to its sad and appalling testimony." "In the Labyrinth is stark and melancholy, the spectrum deliberately limited to wintry monotone," noted Robert Taylor in The Boston Globe', adding that the narrative "combines elements of Kafka nightmare and the nether world of Dostoevsky's House of the Dead." "When faction is as finely wrought, as articulate and principled as John David Morley's," judged Marese Murphy in The Irish Times, "it becomes a serious work of literature."
