= Simon Soloveychik =

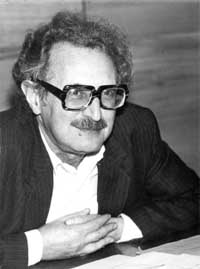
Simon Soloveychik

Simon L'vovich Soloveychik (1930–1996) was a Russian publicist, educator and social philosopher.

== Brief biography ==
Simon Soloveychik was born in a Jewish family. His father, Lev Isomerovich Soloveychik, was editor, writer and administrator at the Krasnaya Zvezda ("Red Star") newspaper, and later managed the Moscow-based Voienizdat publishing house. After graduating from the Philology Department of Moscow State University in 1953 Simon worked as a Boy and Girl Scouts leader, a secondary school teacher, and a correspondent of Pioneer magazine. In 1960 he worked for the newspaper Komsomolskaya Pravda, where he launched a wide theme named "Aly parus" (Scarlet Sail), where he published articles on humanism and morality.

In mid-1980 he initiated a new scientific-practical pedagogical movement – pedagogy of cooperation. From that perspective upbringing of a child was considered not as an influence upon a child but as a dialog between educator and a student. He also regularly published pedagogical articles in the Novoe vremya (New Time) magazine.

In 1992 Soloveychik founded and lead the newspaper Pervoe sentyabrya (First of September), which promoted humanistic pedagogical ideas.

In 1994 Soloveychik wrote the manifest "Chelovek Svobodny" ("Free Man"), in which he briefly and clearly wrote the basic philosophical ideas of upbringing of a free man, and he gave definitions of such concepts as internal freedom and conscience, explained what a free child is, what a free school is, and what the way to raising free men is.

== Parenting for Everyone ==
The main work of his life is his book Pedagogika dlya vseh (Parenting for Everyone, 1977–1986), where he shared his philosophical insights on the goals, means and conditions of parenting free children; he explained how to raise the heart, intelligence and spirit of a free man, and underlined the faults of conventional approaches to parenting.

According to Soloveychik, parenting is the science about the art of upbringing children. The main idea in upbringing is that parents by all means should increase a child's dignity.

"Soloveychik was a classic member of the Russian intelligentsia, focused on underlying ideas and their significance, rather than on what was practical or expedient. He wrote always in defense of teachers and their work... Perhaps the organizing idea of Soloveychik's work was expressed in a remark he … made to a visiting American educator who wanted Soloveychik's reaction to some new psychological theory. "You know," said Simon L'vovich, "everyone thinks that the essence of pedagogy is in psychology, but it's not. The essence of pedagogy is in ethics." It would be a fitting epitaph for this courageous writer and intellectual." — from obituary by Stephen Kerr 10/18/96
