= Destiny, or The Attraction of Affinities =

1996 novel by John David Morley

- First Edition
- Author: John David Morley
- Language: English
- Genre: Fiction, Philosophical
- Publisher: Little, Brown
- Publication date: 1996
- Media type: Print (Hardback & Paperback)
- Pages: 298 pp (Hardback)
- ISBN: 0-316-87807-3

Destiny, or The Attraction of Affinities (1996) is a novel by John David Morley. Beginning in 1934 and ending in 1990, the book comprises a psychological history of modern Germany over several generations.

== Summary ==
Following in his father Magnus's footsteps, Jason Gould travels to Germany in 1961 but, unlike Magnus, Jason never returns to England, remaining to witness the construction of the Berlin Wall and the division of the country, meanwhile falling in love with the daughter of a woman whom his own father had once hoped to marry. Conceived alongside the unification of Germany in 1990, the novel confronts haunting questions about the collective guilt of the Holocaust, the oppressive ideological constraints of life in the GDR and the radical terrorism of the Red Army Faction. The narrative explicitly evokes Kleist’s Michael Kohlhaas and Caspar David Friedrich’s Chalk Cliffs on Rügen, while tracing the evolution of a cultural identity inescapably overshadowed by a political history of perennial trauma.

== Reception ==
Reviewing Destiny in The Independent, Robert Hanks declared it “an uncommonly satisfying book, richly thoughtful and informative, balancing ideas and their symbols with bewitching preciseness.” For Valentine Cunningham, writing in The Times Literary Supplement: “Morley’s modern Germany is given us as a sequence of impossible — shocking, monstrous, buried — facts, which, like the blood of Abel that in the Bible ‘cries out from the ground’, demand explanation. And no one method will, it seems, suffice by itself as an entrée into these horrors. Destiny refuses to settle for any one thing: story, history, art history, documentary, essay, travel-writing. It will be all of these things in turn. And some of these kinds are done with great power.” In his review of the book in The Spectator, Tom Hiney said of Morley's prose: "His writing has soul as well as brains and it is this that makes his fiction engaging."
