= Richard Robinson (philosopher) =

Richard Robinson (Watton, Norfolk, 12 April 1902 – 6 May 1996, Oxford) was an English secularist philosopher.

== Biography ==
Robinson was educated at Repton School and Oxford University.

He taught at Cornell University from 1928 to 1946, then returned to Oxford University for over 20 years. He translated and edited books and articles on Plato and Aristotle.

Most of his books were academic, but An Atheist's Values gave him a popular audience. Nicolas Walter, writing in The Independent, described the book as "one of the best short accounts of liberalism (a term Robinson accepted) and humanism (a term he ignored) produced during the present century, all the more powerful for its lucidity and moderation, its wit and wisdom."

== Works ==
- The Province of Logic (1931)
- Definition (1950)
- An Atheist's Values (1964, Oxford University Press)

--- paperback (1975, Blackwell)

- Essays In Greek Philosophy (1969, Oxford University Press)
- Plato's Earlier Dialectic (1985, Oxford University Press, 2nd Edition)
