= The Blackwell Companion to Philosophy =

1996 reference book

- Editor: Nicholas Bunnin, E. P. Tsui-James
- Genre: Reference
- Publisher: Blackwell Publishers
- Publication date: 1996
- ISBN: 0-631-18788-X

The Blackwell Companion to Philosophy is a reference work in philosophy, edited by Nicholas Bunnin and E. P. Tsui-James, and published by Blackwell Publishers in 1996.
