= Between Facts and Norms =

Monograph by Jürgen Habermas

- Cover of the German edition
- Author: Jürgen Habermas
- Language: German
- Subject: Deliberative democracy
- Published: 1992
- Publication place: Germany
- Media type: Print

Between Facts and Norms (German: Faktizität und Geltung) is a 1992 book on deliberative politics by the German political philosopher Jürgen Habermas. The culmination of the project that Habermas began with The Structural Transformation of the Public Sphere in 1962, it represents a lifetime of political thought on the nature of democracy and law.

== Summary and background ==
Between Facts and Norms offers an original reconstruction of the philosophy of language (drawing on the author's Theory of Communicative Action, first published in 1981), a theory of jurisprudence, an understanding of constitutional theory, reflections on civil society and democracy, and an attempt to construct a new paradigm of politics that goes beyond, but without discarding, the liberal tradition. At the heart of the book is a reconsideration of the relation between the philosophy of law and political theory.

Criticized for his "discourse ethics" first propounded in 1990, Habermas, in this book, attempts to draw out the political, legal, and institutional implications of his theory, asserting that discourse ethics ought to be complemented by a theory of socialisation that accounts for its institutionalisation. ("Discourse ethics" is Habermas's attempt to explain the universal and obligatory nature of morality by evoking the universal obligations of communicative rationality.)

Habermas contends that law is the primary medium of social integration in modern society, and is power that extracts obedience from its subjects. As power alone cannot grant it its legitimacy in modern society, law derives its validity from the consent of the governed.

Habermas further accommodates his critics on the role of law by making a distinction between ethics and morality. In a modern pluralist culture, he argues, normative issues should be separated from issues of the good life. Only when various ethical traditions come into conflict with one another, as they inevitably do in a modern pluralist culture, do normative issues arise that have implications for everyone. In Habermas' deliberative paradigm, law stabilizes society, but only through the universal voice of democracy.

Between Facts and Norms concludes with a proposal for a new paradigm of law that goes beyond the dichotomies that have afflicted modern political theory from its inception, and that still underlie current controversies between so-called liberals and republicans.

== See also ==
- Facticity (German: Faktizität) – Philosophical concept with multiple meanings
- Fact–value distinction – Distinction between what is and what ought to be
- Is–ought problem – Philosophical problem articulated by David Hume
- Post-truth – Concept regarding objective facts
