= Lojze Ude =

Slovene lawyer, journalist and historian

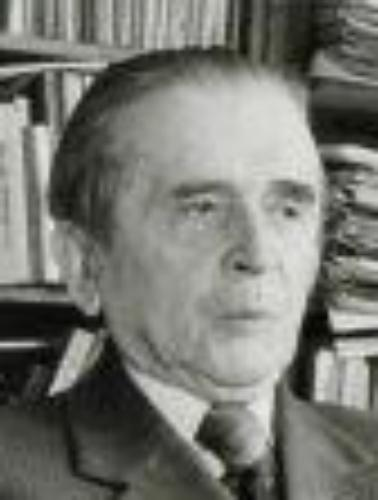
Lojze Ude

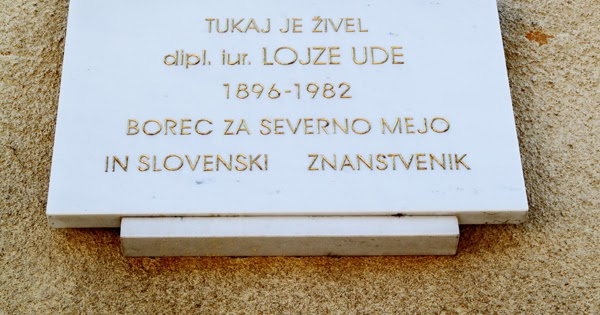
Memorial inscription at his residence in Tržič. It is written on the plaque: "B.Sc. iur. Lojze Ude 1896—1982 lived here, a fighter for the northern border and Slovene scientist."

Lojze Ude (June 18, 1896 in Križe, Tržič, Austria-Hungary – February 28, 1982 in Lošinj, Socialist Federal Republic of Yugoslavia) was a Slovene lawyer, journalist and historian.

== Honours ==
- Golden Obilić Medal (1920)
- Order of Merit with Silver Rays (1951)
- Order of Brotherhood and Unity with Silver Rays (1951)
- Order of the Red Flag (1956)
- Order of Merit with Silver Star (1968)
- Order of Valour (1972)
- Order of the Republic with Golden Wreath (1979)
- Drabosnjak Prize (1966)
- Kidrič Prize (1978)

== Selected works ==
- Koroški zbornik, Državna založba Slovenije, 1946
- Slovenci in jugoslovanska skupnost, Obzorja, 1972
- Koroško vprašanje, Drẑavna zaloẑba Slovenije, 1976
- Boj za severno slovensko mejo: 1918-1919, Založba obzorja, 1977
