= Pictures from the Water Trade =

1985 novel by John David Morley

- First Edition (UK)
- Author: John David Morley
- Language: English
- Genre: Fiction, Travel literature, Philosophical
- Publisher: André Deutsch (UK); Atlantic Monthly Press (US)
- Publication date: 1985
- Media type: Print (Hardback & Paperback)
- Pages: 259 pp (UK Hardback)
- ISBN: 0-233-97703-1 (UK) ISBN 0-06-097041-3 (US)

Pictures from the Water Trade: An Englishman in Japan (1985) — published in the US as Pictures from the Water Trade: Adventures of a Westerner in Japan — is a novel by John David Morley, a cultural investigation of Japan in the 1970s.

== Summary ==
Told from the perspective of an authorial alias called ‘Boon’ (‘Bun-san’ to the Japanese), the book describes a series of initiations into Japanese language, family relations, love rites, shodo and the Mizu shōbai itself — the ‘water trade’ — a seedy night-world of cabarets, bars and brothels.

== Reception ==
Writing in The New York Times Book Review, novelist Anne Tyler described the book as “travel literature at its best” and hailed its author as “one of those rare travelers who manages truly to enter the heart of a foreign territory.” "Morley's success places him, with a single book, in the front rank of the world’s travel writers,” wrote Dennis Drabelle in the Smithsonian. Dutch novelist and travel writer Cees Nooteboom praised it as “a very special book” in his review in Vrij Nederland Boekenbijlage. "Splendid," declared Kazuo Ishiguro in the London Review of Books, an "absorbing book about one man’s attempt to penetrate an ultimately closed society", while in the Literary Review Jonathan Keates acclaimed it as “maybe the best record of western impressions in a hundred years." “It is still possible for a writer to visit another country and surprise us with it — not necessarily by seeing it as a traveler, but simply by experiencing it brilliantly,” wrote Anatole Broyard in The New York Times Book Review. "John David Morley did this for modern Japan in his Pictures From the Water Trade."

Pictures from the Water Trade was designated a notable book by The New York Times Book Review and featured in Time Magazine's list of the best books of 1985.
