= Intisar-ul-Haque =

Pakistani Philosopher

- Born: October 20, 1935; Lahore, Punjab, British India
- Died: August 4, 1996
- Education: M.A. Punjab University, Honours London University, Ph.D. University of Edinburgh
- Occupation: Professor Pakistani

Intisar-Ul-Haque (20 October 1935 – 4 August 1996) was a Pakistani philosopher. He served as the chairman of the Department of Philosophy, at University of Peshawar and held the postdoctoral Alexander von Humboldt Senior Fellowship, Germany 1974–76, and Senior Fulbright Fellowship 1984-85. He received a Ph.D. in analytical philosophy and logic from the University of Edinburgh in 1966; his thesis was called "Study of logical paradoxes".

He was the chairman of the philosophy department of the University of Peshawar for over three decades. He studied analytical philosophy. He was a fellow of the Alexander von Humboldt Foundation.

== Early life ==
Intisar-Ul-Haque was born in October 1935. He got his master's degree from Lahore and did his B.A. honours from University of London in 1961. He later went to the University of Edinburgh where he completed his Ph.D. in analytical philosophy. He joined Peshawar University and continued to teach there till his death.

== Work ==
He wrote several books and articles on philosophy and logic, including "Philosophy of Religion".

Intisar's areas of interest included logic, the philosophy of logic and analytical philosophy.

== Books ==
Selected works by Manzoor Ahmad
Title	Year	Notes
Philosophy of Science and Religion	1987	Explores the relationship between scientific inquiry and religious thought.
Introduction to Logic	1992	A foundational text on logical reasoning and argumentation.
Philosophical Problems of Modern Science	1997	Discusses key issues in the philosophy of modern science.
Science, Religion, and Reality	2001	Examines the interaction between scientific knowledge and metaphysical questions.
