= Christopher Ryan (author) =

American author (born 1962)

- Born: February 13, 1962 (age 64)
- Education: Saybrook University (BA, MA, PhD)
- Occupation: Author
- Spouse: Cacilda Jethá
- Website: http://www.chrisryanphd.com

Christopher Ryan (born February 13, 1962) is an American author best known for co-authoring the book Sex at Dawn (2010).

== Education ==
Ryan received a B.A. in English and American literature in 1984, and, twenty years later, an M.A. and PhD in psychology from Saybrook University, an accredited, hybrid, low-residency/online learning program based in San Francisco. His master's thesis examined differences in specific personality measures between working fashion models and the general public. His doctoral dissertation analyzed the prehistoric roots of human sexuality. It was guided by the psychologist Stanley Krippner, a humanistic psychologist, Sabrina Zirkel, and Jürgen W. Kremer.

== Career ==
In 2010, Ryan and Cacilda Jethá published Sex at Dawn: The Prehistoric Origins of Modern Sexuality. The book examines the evolution of human mating systems, disputing what the authors see as the "standard narrative" of human sexual evolution. It contends that having multiple sexual partners was common and accepted in the environment of evolutionary adaptation, since, ostensibly, mobile, self-contained groups of hunter-gatherers were the norm for humans before agriculture led to high-population density. Before agriculture, according to the authors, sexual relations were promiscuous and paternity was not a concern, a dynamic similar to the mating system of bonobos, our most closely related primate.

The book generated a great deal of publicity, while numerous scholars from related academic disciplines—such as anthropology, evolutionary psychology, primatology, biology, and sexology—were critical of its methodology and conclusions, although some have commended its arguments.

In 2013, Ryan gave a TED talk titled "Are we designed to be sexual omnivores?" The same year, Psychology Today began hosting his blog. Ryan hosts a podcast called Tangentially Speaking with Dr. Christopher Ryan.

In 2017, Ryan was featured in Monogamish, a documentary directed by Tao Ruspoli exploring contemporary attitudes toward monogamy, marriage, and alternative relationship structures within American society.

In 2019, Ryan published the book Civilized to Death: What Was Lost on the Way to Modernity (Note: Also known as Civilized to Death: The Price of Progress) as well as the ebooks Tangentially Reading (ASIN B07C91LTZ2) and Tangentially Talking Drugs (ASIN B07Y6TWJ7Z), drawing material from his podcast.

== Private life ==
Ryan is married to his sometime collaborator and co-author of Sex at Dawn, Cacilda Jethá.
