= The Feast of Fools =

1994 novel by John David Morley

- First edition (US)
- Author: John David Morley
- Language: English
- Genre: Fiction, Philosophical
- Publisher: Abacus, St. Martin's Press
- Publication date: 1994
- Media type: Print (Hardback & Paperback)
- Pages: 445 pp (US Hardback)
- ISBN: 0-349-10519-7 (UK) ISBN 0-312-11786-8 (US)

The Feast of Fools (1994) is a novel by John David Morley, a neo-Joycean translation of the Greek myth of Persephone to contemporary Munich.

== Summary ==
On the day of her wedding to the artist Brum, Stephanie elopes with the undertaker Max at the autumn equinox. Thus begins an epic novel encompassing astrology, astronomy, antiquarian glossaries, mortuary science, fencing guilds, love, sex and Commedia dell'arte, spanning the dream-lives of a community of modern-day characters during the medieval carnival season of Fasching.

== Reception ==
“A gorgeous puzzle-book of a novel, beautifully detailed and painstakingly crafted by a brilliant parodist,” judged The Globe and Mail. ""A stunning achievement," declared D. M. Thomas. "The Feast of Fools is one of those rare novels that has the richness and power of myth without sacrificing the more terrestrial virtues of elegance, erotic pleasure, wit, and narrative skill." “The glittering prose is enchanting” wrote Erica Wagner in The Times. “The style is rich and amethyst,” remarked Simon Rees in The Independent: “There are memorable phrases, descriptions that stick in the mind like tunes or smells, and a relish for a huge vocabulary which is put to work on pear-picking, frost, sex, furniture and much besides.” “Although the year is not far advanced, it is unlikely to yield a more bizarre or ambivalent reading experience than The Feast of Fools," wrote Robert Taylor in The Boston Globe. "It is highly pretentious, often obscure, occasionally verbose and turgid,” Taylor continued, concluding: "Feast could become a cult item like John Fowles' The Magus." "In an age of planned literary obsolescence, serious writers can vanish in the cracks between hype and distraction," literary critic Ihab Hassan noted in World Literature Today: "John David Morley is a very serious writer, abundantly gifted — his work sometimes brings Joyce, sometimes Pynchon to mind — and he rightly demands our fullest attention."

The Feast of Fools became, in 1991, the first non-German language book to receive a City of Munich Literary Prize while still a work in progress. Post-publication, the novel was designated a notable book by The New York Times Book Review, and longlisted in the 'International Fiction' category for the 1995 Irish Times International Literature Prize, an award ultimately given to J. M. Coetzee's The Master of Petersburg.
