= David P. Barash =

American psychologist

David P. Barash (born 1946) is professor of psychology emeritus at the University of Washington. He has written, edited or co-authored 40 books, including ones on human aggression, peace studies, and the sexual behavior of animals and people. He received his bachelor's degree in biology from Harpur College, Binghamton University, and a Ph.D. in zoology from University of Wisconsin–Madison in 1970. He taught at the State University of New York at Oneonta and then accepted a permanent position at the University of Washington.

== Views ==
Barash is an outspoken supporter of science communication, believing that it is necessary in an era where science relies on public funding on a large scale and is vulnerable to being undermined by politicians who do not understand it.

Barash scathingly criticised Jean Philippe Rushton and his application of r/K selection theory to the study of human races. "Bad science and virulent racial prejudice drip like pus from nearly every page of this despicable book," said Barash of Rushton's Race, Evolution, and Behaviour.

== Works ==
His book Natural Selections: Selfish Altruists, Honest Liars and Other Realities of Evolution is based on articles in the Chronicle of Higher Education.

Madame Bovary's Ovaries: a Darwinian look at literature, a popular but serious presentation of Darwinian literary criticism, was jointly written with his daughter, Nanelle Rose Barash. He has also written over 230 scholarly articles and is a fellow of the American Association for the Advancement of Science.

=== Literary works ===
- David P. Barash. "OOPS! The Worst Blunders of All Time, from Pandora’s Box to Putin’s War", Skyhorse Publishing, 2023
- David P. Barash. "Threats: intimidation and its discontents", Oxford University Press, 2020
- David P. Barash. Through a Glass Brightly: using science to see our species as it really is, Oxford University Press, 2018
- David P. Barash and Judith Eve Lipton. "Strength Through Peace: demilitarization in Costa Rica, and what we can learn from a small tropical country", Oxford University Press, 2018
- David P. Barash. Out of Eden: The Surprising Consequences of Polygamy, Oxford University Press, 2016
- David P. Barash. Buddhist Biology: Ancient Eastern Wisdom Meets Modern Western Science, Oxford University Press, 2013
- David P. Barash. Homo Mysterious: Evolutionary Puzzles of Human Nature, Oxford University Press, 2012; paperback, Oxford University Press, 2013
- David P. Barash and Judith Eve Lipton. Payback: why we retaliate, redirect aggression and seek revenge, Oxford University Press, 2011
- David P. Barash and Judith Eve Lipton. Strange Bedfellows: the surprising connection between sex, evolution and monogamy, Bellevue Literary Press, 2010
- David P. Barash and Judith Eve Lipton. How Women Got Their Curves and Other Just-So Stories, Columbia University Press, 2009
- David P. Barash. Natural Selections: Natural Selections: selfish altruists, honest liars and other realities of evolution Bellevue Literary Press, 2007
- David P. Barash and Nanelle R. Barash. Madame Bovary's Ovaries: a Darwinian look at literature, Delacorte, 2005
- David P. Barash. The Survival Game: how game theory explains cooperation and competition, Henry Holt/Times Books, 2003
- David P. Barash and Judith Eve Lipton. Making Sense of Sex: how genes gender influence our relationships. Island Press/Shearwater Books, 1997; paperback edition as Gender Gap: the biology of male-female differences, Transaction Publishers, 2001
- Barash, D. & Lipton, J. (2001). The Myth of Monogamy – Fidelity and Infidelity in Animals and People. New York: Henry Holt and Company; ISBN 0-8050-7136-9
  - Review by T. R Birkhead
- David P. Barash. Revolutionary Biology: the new, gene-centered view of life. Transaction Publishers, 2001
- David P. Barash and Ilona Anne Barash. The Mammal in the Mirror: understanding our place in the animal world (W. H. Freeman, 2000;
- David P. Barash. Beloved Enemies: our need for opponents, Prometheus Books, 1994
- David P. Barash. The L Word: an unapologetic, thoroughly biased, long-overdue explication and celebration of liberalism, William Morrow, 1992
- David P. Barash. The Great Outdoors Lyle Stuart, 1989; in paper as Give Peas a Chance, Lyle Stuart, 1991
- David P. Barash. The Hare and the Tortoise: the conflict between culture and biology in human affairs, Viking, 1986; Penguin, 1987
  - translated into six languages
- David P. Barash & Judith Eve Lipton. The Caveman and the Bomb: human nature, evolution, and nuclear war McGraw-Hill, 1985; Olive Branch Award nominee)
- David P. Barash & Judith Eve Lipton. Stop Nuclear War! A handbook Grove Press, 1982;
  - (National Book Award nominee)
- David P. Barash. Aging: an exploration/ Univ. of Washington Press, 1981;
  - translated into two languages
- David P. Barash. The Whisperings Within: evolution and the origin of human nature Harper & Row, 1979; Penguin, 1980;
  - translated into seven languages

=== Academic books ===
- David P. Barash. Approaches to Peace Oxford University Press, 2000; 2nd edition, 2010; 3rd edition, 2013
- David P. Barash and Charles Webel. Peace and Conflict Studies. Sage Publications, 2002; 2nd edition, 2008
- Arthur Gandolfi, Anna S. Gandolfi, and David P. Barash. Economics as an Evolutionary Science: from utility to fitness. Transaction Publishers, 2002
- David P. Barash. Understanding Violence Allyn & Bacon, 2001;
- David P. Barash. Ideas of Human Nature: from the Bhagavad Gita to sociobiology Prentice Hall,1998
- David P. Barash. Introduction to Peace Studies Wadsworth, 1991
- David P. Barash. Marmots: social behavior and ecology Stanford University Press, 1989
- David P. Barash. The Arms Race and Nuclear War Wadsworth, 1986
- David P. Barash. Sociobiology and Behavior Elsevier, 1977; 2nd, revised edition, 1982
