= Post-truth =

Concept regarding objective facts

Post-truth is a term that refers to the widespread documentation of, and concern about, disputes over public truth claims in the 21st century. The term's academic development refers to the theories and research that seek to explain the specific causes historically, and the effects of the phenomenon. Oxford Dictionaries popularly defines it as "relating to and denoting circumstances in which objective facts are less influential in shaping public opinion than appeals to emotion and personal belief."

While the term was used in phrases like "post-truth politics" academically and publicly before 2016, in 2016 the term was named Word of the Year by Oxford Dictionaries after the term's proliferation in the first election of President Trump in the United States and the Brexit referendum in the United Kingdom; Donald Trump has been characterized as engaging in a "war on truth". Oxford Dictionaries further notes that post-truth was often used as an adjective to signal a distinctive kind of politics.

Some scholars argue that post-truth has similarities with past moral, epistemic, and political debates about relativism, postmodernity, and dishonesty in politics. Others insist that post-truth is specifically concerned with 21st century communication technologies and cultural practices.

== Historical precedents in philosophy ==
Post-truth is about a historical problem regarding truth in everyday life, especially politics. But truth has long been one of the major preoccupations of philosophy. Truth is also one of the most complicated concepts in the history of philosophy, and much of the research and public debate about post-truth assumes a particular theory of truth, what philosophers call a correspondence theory of truth. The latter might be considered the most prominent theory of truth, though with its share of critics, whereby words correspond to an accepted or mutually available reality to be examined and confirmed. Another major theory of truth is coherence theory, where truth is not just about one claim but a series of statements that cohere about the world.

Several academic experts note that the emphasis on philosophical debates about truth have little to do with the concept of post-truth as it has historically emerged in popular politics (see post-truth politics), not in philosophy. As the philosopher Julian Baggini explains:

The merits of these competing theories are of mainly academic concern. When people debate whether there were weapons of mass destruction in Saddam Hussain's Iraq, whether global warming is real and anthropogenic, or whether austerity is necessary, their disagreements are not the consequence of competing theories of truth. No witness need ask a judge which theory she has in mind when asked to promise to tell the truth, the whole truth and nothing but the truth. Why then has truth become so problematic in the world outside academic philosophy? One reason is that there is major disagreement and uncertainty concerning what counts as a reliable source of truth. For most of human history, there was some stable combination of trust in religious texts and leaders, learned experts and the enduring folk wisdom called common sense. Now, it seems, virtually nothing is universally taken as an authority. This leaves us having to pick our own experts or simply to trust our guts.

It follows that according to experts who approach the concept of post-truth as something historically specific, as a contemporary sociological phenomenon, post-truth theory is only remotely related to traditional debates in philosophy about the nature of truth. In other words, post-truth as a contemporary phenomenon is not about asking "what is truth?" or "is X true?" but "why don't we agree that this or that is true?" A broad range of scholarship increasingly insists a breakdown in institutional authority for truth-telling (government, news media, especially) ushered by new media and communication technologies of user-generated content, new media editing technologies (visual, audio-visual), and a saturating promotional culture has resulted in confusion and "games of truth"-telling, even truth markets.

=== Friedrich Nietzsche ===
Not all commentators, however, treat post-truth as a historically specific phenomenon discussed through implicit correspondence, coherence, or pragmatist theories of truth. They discuss it within a philosophical tradition that asks what truth is. Friedrich Nietzsche, a 19th-century German philosopher, is sometimes cited in this camp of post-truth commentators.

Friedrich Nietzsche is sometimes invoked as a predecessor to theories of post-truth. He argues that humans create the concepts through which they define the good and the just, thereby replacing the concept of truth with the concept of value, and grounding reality in the human will and will to power.

In his 1873 essay Truth and Lying in an Extra-Moral Sense, Nietzsche holds that humans create truth about the world through their use of metaphor, myth, and poetry. He writes,

If someone hides an object behind a bush, then seeks and finds it there, that seeking and finding is not very laudable: but that is the way it is with the seeking and finding of "truth" within the rational sphere. If I define the mammal and then after examining a camel declare, "See, a mammal", a truth is brought to light, but it is of limited value. I mean, it is anthropomorphic through and through and contains not a single point that would be "true in itself" or really and universally valid, apart from man. The investigator into such truths is basically seeking just the metamorphosis of the world into man; he is struggling to understand the world as a human-like thing and acquires at best a feeling of assimilation.

According to Nietzsche, all insights and ideas arise from a particular perspective. This means that there are many possible perspectives in which a truth or value judgment can be made. This amounts to declaring that there is no "true" way of seeing the world, but it does not necessarily mean that all perspectives are equally valid.

Nietzschean perspectivism denies that a metaphysical objectivism is anything possible and asserts that there are no objective evaluations capable of transcending any cultural formation or subjective designations. This means that there are no objective facts and that understanding or knowledge of a thing in itself is not possible:

Against positivism, which stops at phenomena: "there are only the facts". I would say: no, there really are no facts, but only interpretations. We cannot ascertain any fact "in itself".

Therefore, the truth (and above all the belief in it) is an error, but it is an error necessary for life: "Truth is a kind of error without which a certain kind of living creature would not be able to live". (The Will to Power, KGW VII, 34 [253].)

=== Max Weber ===
In his essay Science as a Vocation (1917) Max Weber draws a distinction between facts and values. He argues that facts can be determined through the methods of a value-free, objective social science, while values are derived through culture and religion, the truth of which cannot be known through science. He writes, "it is one thing to state facts, to determine mathematical or logical relations or the internal structure of cultural values, while it is another thing to answer questions of the value of culture and its individual contents and the question of how one should act in the cultural community and in political associations. These are quite heterogeneous problems." In his 1919 essay Politics as a Vocation, he argues that facts, like actions, do not in themselves contain any intrinsic meaning or power: "any ethic in the world could establish substantially identical commandments applicable to all relationships."

== Critical theory and continental philosophy ==
Some influential philosophers are skeptical of the division between facts and values. They argue that scientific facts are socially produced through relations of power.

=== Bruno Latour ===
The French philosopher Bruno Latour has been criticized for contributing to the intellectual foundations for post-truth. In 2018, the New York Times ran a profile on Bruno Latour and post-truth politics. According to the article,

In a series of controversial books in the 1970s and 1980s, [Latour] argued that scientific facts should instead be seen as a product of scientific inquiry. Facts, Latour said according to his actor-network theory, were "networked"; they stood or fell not on the strength of their inherent veracity but on the strength of the institutions and practices that produced them and made them intelligible.

However, the article claims that it is a misinterpretation to claim that Latour doesn't believe in reality or that truth is relative:

Had they been among our circus that day, Latour's critics might have felt that there was something odd about the scene – the old adversary of science worshipers kneeling before the altar of science. But what they would have missed – what they have always missed – was that Latour never sought to deny the existence of gravity. He has been doing something much more unusual: trying to redescribe the conditions by which this knowledge comes to be known.

The disputable reputation of Latour as a "fact-denier", stemmed from his article in La Recherche (1998), a French monthly magazine. Here Latour discusses the discovery in 1976, by French scientists working on the mummy of the pharaoh Ramses II, that his death was due to tuberculosis. In the 1990s, Jean Bricmont and Alan Sokal wrote of Latour:

"How could he pass away due to a bacillus discovered by Robert Koch in 1882?" Latour argues that it would be an anachronism to assert that Ramses II was killed by machine-gun fire or died from the stress provoked by a stock-market crash. But then, Latour also asks why isn't death from tuberculosis likewise an anachronism? His answer: "Before Koch, the bacillus has no real existence." He dismisses the common-sense notion that Koch discovered a pre-existing bacillus as "having only the appearance of common sense".

In this sense, Latour (or Michel Foucault as well) draws attention to the institutional and practical contingencies for producing knowledge (which in science is always changing at slower and faster rates).

=== Hannah Arendt ===
Hannah Arendt has been cited as an important conceptual resource for post-truth theory in that she attempted to theorize something historically shifting, instead of meditating on the nature of truth itself. In her essay Lying in Politics (1972), Hannah Arendt describes what she terms defactualization, or the inability to discern fact from fiction – a concept very close to what we now understand by post-truth. The essay's central theme is the thoroughgoing political deception that was unveiled with the leaking of the Pentagon Papers in 1971. Her main target of critique is the professional "problem-solvers" tasked with solving American foreign policy "problems" during the Vietnam War, and who comprised the group that authored the McNamara report.

Arendt distinguishes defactualization from deliberate falsehood and from lying. She writes,

The deliberate falsehood deals with contingent facts; that is, with matters that carry no inherent truth within themselves, no necessity to be as they are. Factual truths are never compellingly true. The historian knows how vulnerable is the whole texture of facts in which we spend our daily life; it is always in danger of being perforated by single lies or torn to shreds by the organized lying of groups, nations, or classes, or denied and distorted, often carefully covered up by reams of falsehoods or simply allowed to fall into oblivion.

She goes on,

There always comes the point beyond which lying becomes counterproductive. This point is reached when the audience to which the lies are addressed is forced to disregard altogether the distinguishing line between truth and falsehood in order to be able to survive. Truth or falsehood – it does not matter which anymore, if your life depends on your acting as though you trusted; truth that can be relied on disappears entirely from public life, and with it the chief stabilizing factor in the ever-changing affairs of men.

Arendt faults the Vietnam era problem-solvers with being overly rational, "trained in translating all factual contents into the language of numbers and percentages", and out of touch with the facts of "given reality." Contrary to contemporary definitions of post-truth that emphasize a reliance on emotion over facts and evidence, Arendt's notion of defactualization identifies hyper-rationality as the mechanism that blurs the line between "fact and fantasy": the problem-solvers "were indeed to a rather frightening degree above 'sentimentality' and in love with 'theory', the world of sheer mental effort. They were eager to find formulas, preferably expressed in a pseudo-mathematical language..."

Arendt writes: "What these problem-solvers have in common with down-to-earth liars is the attempt to get rid of facts and the confidence that this should be possible because of the inherent contingency of facts." She explains that deception and even self-deception are rendered meaningless in a defactualized world, for both rely on preserving the distinction between truth and falsehood. On the other hand, in a defactualized environment, the individual "loses all contact with not only his audience, but also the real world, which will still catch up with him because he can remove his mind from it but not his body."

Arendt specifically pointed to advertising (and what has recently been described as an all-encompassing "promotional culture") as having played a primary role in creating knowledge conditions of "ready to buy" that contemporary thinkers describe as characteristic of post-truth.

She spoke of a "recent variety" added to "the many genres in the art of lying developed in the past: the apparently innocuous one of the public-relations managers in government who learned their trade from the inventiveness of Madison Avenue." Arendt noted that their "origin [lay] in the consumer society" (p. 8). This importation from consumer society to politics was problematic, according to Hannah Arendt, for public relations "deals only in opinions and 'good will,' the readiness to buy, that is, in intangibles whose concrete reality is at a minimum."

Referring to the aforementioned concept of "defactualization" by Arendt, but applying it to the information society of the twenty-first century, Byung-Chul Han argues that a "new nihilism" is emerging, in which the lie is no longer passed off as truth, or in which the truth is disavowed as a lie. Rather it is the very distinction between truth and falsehood that is undermined. Anyone who knowingly lies and resists the truth, paradoxically recognizes it. Lying is possible only where the distinction between truth and falsehood is intact. The liar does not lose touch with the truth. His faith in reality does not waver. The liar is not a nihilist, he does not question truth itself. The more determined he lies, the more the truth is confirmed. "Fake news" are not lies: they attack "facticity" itself. They "de-facticize" reality. When Donald Trump offhandedly says whatever suits him, he is not a classic liar knowingly distorting reality, as to do that one would need to know it. He is rather indifferent to the truth of facts.

== Contemporary evaluation ==
Carl Sagan, a famous astronomer and science communicator, argued in his work The Demon-Haunted World: Science as a Candle in the Dark:

Science is more than a body of knowledge; it is a way of thinking. I have a foreboding of an America in my children's or grandchildren's time – when the United States is a service and information economy; when nearly all the key manufacturing industries have slipped away to other countries; when awesome technological powers are in the hands of a very few, and no one representing the public interest can even grasp the issues; when the people have lost the ability to set their own agendas or knowledgeably question those in authority; when, clutching our crystals and nervously consulting our horoscopes, our critical faculties in decline, unable to distinguish between what feels good and what's true, we slide, almost without noticing, back into superstition and darkness.

Carl Sagan's words are thought to be a prediction of a "post-truth" or "alternative facts" world. Following this, some scholars use the term "post-truth" to refer to such "a situation in society and politics, in which the boundary between truth and untruth is erased, facts and related narratives are purposefully produced, emotions are more important than knowledge and the actors of social or political life do not care for truth, proof and evidence".

In the context of politics, post-truth has recently been applied to the 2016 and 2020 U.S. presidential elections, Brexit, the COVID-19 "infodemic", and the conditions that led to the storming of the US capital on January 6, 2021. The historian Timothy Snyder wrote of post-truth and the 2021 storming of the United States Capitol:

Post-truth is pre-fascism... When we give up on truth, we concede power to those with the wealth and charisma to create spectacle in its place. Without agreement about some basic facts, citizens cannot form the civil society that would allow them to defend themselves. If we lose the institutions that produce facts that are pertinent to us, then we tend to wallow in attractive abstractions and fictions... Post-truth wears away the rule of law and invites a regime of myth.

The writer George Gillett has suggested that the term "post-truth" mistakenly conflates empirical and ethical judgements, writing that the supposedly "post-truth" movement is in fact a rebellion against "expert economic opinion becoming a surrogate for values-based political judgements".

== See also ==
- Alternative facts
- Consensus reality
- Consensus theory of truth
- Critical theory
- Degree of truth
- Fake news
- False or misleading statements by Donald Trump
- Filter bubble
- Misinformation
- Nihilism
- Perspectivism
- Philosophical skepticism
- Postmodern philosophy
- Post-truth politics
- Relativism
- Social bot
- Social constructionism
- Truthiness
