= Fact–value distinction =

Distinction between what is and what ought to be

The fact–value distinction is an epistemological distinction between:

1. Statements of fact (positive or descriptive statements), which are based upon reason and observation, and which are examined via the empirical method.
2. Statements of value (normative or prescriptive statements), such as good and bad, beauty and ugliness, which encompass ethics and aesthetics, and which are studied via axiology.

This epistemological distinction suggests that ethical claims cannot be derived from or defended by factual arguments.

The fact–value distinction is closely related to David Hume's is–ought problem in moral philosophy. The terms are often used interchangeably, though philosophical discourse concerning the is–ought problem does not usually encompass aesthetics.

== David Hume's skepticism ==
In A Treatise of Human Nature (1739), David Hume discusses the problems in grounding normative statements in positive statements; that is, in deriving ought from is. It is generally regarded that Hume considered such derivations untenable, and his 'is–ought' problem is considered a principal question of moral philosophy.

Hume shared a political viewpoint with early Enlightenment philosophers such as Thomas Hobbes (1588–1679) and John Locke (1632–1704). Specifically, Hume, at least to some extent, argued that religious and national hostilities that divided European society were based on unfounded beliefs. In effect, Hume contended that such hostilities are not found in nature, but are a human creation, depending on a particular time and place, and thus unworthy of mortal conflict.

Prior to Hume, Aristotelian philosophy maintained that all actions and causes were to be interpreted teleologically. This rendered all facts about human action examinable under a normative framework defined by cardinal virtues and capital vices. "Fact" in this sense was not value-free, and the fact-value distinction was an alien concept. The decline of Aristotelianism in the 16th century set the framework in which those theories of knowledge could be revised.

== Naturalistic fallacy ==
The fact–value distinction is closely related to the naturalistic fallacy, a topic debated in ethical and moral philosophy. G. E. Moore believed it essential to all ethical thinking. However, contemporary philosophers like Philippa Foot have called into question the validity of such assumptions. Others, such as Ruth Anna Putnam, argue that even the most "scientific" of disciplines are affected by the "values" of those who research and practice the vocation. Nevertheless, the difference between the naturalistic fallacy and the fact–value distinction is derived from the manner in which modern social science has used the fact–value distinction, and not the strict naturalistic fallacy to articulate new fields of study and create academic disciplines.

== Moralistic fallacy ==
The fact–value distinction is also closely related to the moralistic fallacy, an invalid inference of factual conclusions from purely evaluative premises. For example, an invalid inference "Because everybody ought to be equal, there are no innate genetic differences between people" is an instance of the moralistic fallacy. Where the naturalistic fallacy attempts to move from an "is" to an "ought" statement, the moralistic fallacy attempts to move from an "ought" to an "is" statement.

== Nietzsche's table of values ==
Friedrich Nietzsche (1844–1900) in Thus Spoke Zarathustra said that a table of values hangs above every great people. Nietzsche argues that what is common among different peoples is the act of esteeming, of creating values, even if the values are different from one people to the next. Nietzsche asserts that what made people great was not the content of their beliefs, but the act of valuing. Thus the values a community strives to articulate are not as important as the collective will to act on those values. The willing is more essential than the intrinsic worth of the goal itself, according to Nietzsche. "A thousand goals have there been so far," says Zarathustra, "for there are a thousand peoples. Only the yoke for the thousand necks is still lacking: the one goal is lacking. Humanity still has no goal." Hence, the title of the aphorism, "On The Thousand And One Goals." The idea that one value system is no more worthy than the next, although it may not be directly ascribed to Nietzsche, has become a common premise in modern social science. Max Weber and Martin Heidegger absorbed it and made it their own. It shaped their philosophical endeavor, as well as their political understanding.

== Religion and science ==
In his essay Science as a Vocation (1917) Max Weber draws a distinction between facts and values. He argues that facts can be determined through the methods of a value-free, objective social science, while values are derived through culture and religion, the truth of which cannot be known through science. He writes, "it is one thing to state facts, to determine mathematical or logical relations or the internal structure of cultural values, while it is another thing to answer questions of the value of culture and its individual contents and the question of how one should act in the cultural community and in political associations. These are quite heterogeneous problems." In his 1919 essay Politics as a Vocation, he argues that facts, like actions, do not in themselves contain any intrinsic meaning or power: "any ethic in the world could establish substantially identical commandments applicable to all relationships."

According to Martin Luther King Jr., "Science deals mainly with facts; religion deals mainly with values. The two are not rivals. They are complementary." He stated that science keeps religion from "crippling irrationalism and paralyzing obscurantism" whereas Religion prevents science from "falling into ... obsolete materialism and moral nihilism."

Albert Einstein remarked that

the realms of religion and science in themselves are clearly marked off from each other, nevertheless there exist between the two strong reciprocal relationships and dependencies. Though religion may be that which determines the goal, it has, nevertheless, learned from science, in the broadest sense, what means will contribute to the attainment of the goals it has set up. But science can only be created by those who are thoroughly imbued with the aspiration toward truth and understanding. This source of feeling, however, springs from the sphere of religion. To this there also belongs the faith in the possibility that the regulations valid for the world of existence are rational, that is, comprehensible to reason. I cannot conceive of a genuine scientist without that profound faith. The situation may be expressed by an image: science without religion is lame, religion without science is blind.

== Criticisms ==
Virtually all modern philosophers affirm some sort of fact–value distinction, insofar as they distinguish between science and "valued" disciplines such as ethics, aesthetics, or the fine arts. However, philosophers such as Hilary Putnam argue that the distinction between fact and value is not as absolute as Hume envisioned. Philosophical pragmatists, for instance, believe that true propositions are those that are useful or effective in predicting future (empirical) states of affairs. Far from being value-free, the pragmatists' conception of truth or facts directly relates to an end (namely, empirical predictability) that human beings regard as normatively desirable. Other thinkers, such as N. R. Hanson among others, talk of theory-ladenness, and reject an absolutist fact–value distinction by contending that our senses are imbued with prior conceptualizations, making it impossible to have any observation that is totally value-free, which is how Hume and the later positivists conceived of facts.

=== Functionalist counterexamples ===
Several counterexamples have been offered by philosophers claiming to show that there are cases when an evaluative statement does indeed logically follow from a factual statement. A. N. Prior argues, from the statement "He is a sea captain," that it logically follows, "He ought to do what a sea captain ought to do." Alasdair MacIntyre argues, from the statement "This watch is grossly inaccurate and irregular in time-keeping and too heavy to carry about comfortably," that the evaluative conclusion validly follows, "This is a bad watch." John Searle argues, from the statement "Jones promised to pay Smith five dollars," that it logically follows that "Jones ought to pay Smith five dollars", such that the act of promising by definition places the promiser under obligation.

=== Moral realism ===
Philippa Foot adopts a moral realist position, criticizing the idea that when evaluation is superposed on fact there has been a "committal in a new dimension". She introduces, by analogy, the practical implications of using the word "injury". Not just anything counts as an injury. There must be some impairment. When we suppose a man wants the things the injury prevents him from obtaining, haven’t we fallen into the old naturalist fallacy?

It may seem that the only way to make a necessary connection between 'injury' and the things that are to be avoided, is to say that it is only used in an 'action-guiding sense' when applied to something the speaker intends to avoid. But we should look carefully at the crucial move in that argument, and query the suggestion that someone might happen not to want anything for which he would need the use of hands or eyes. Hands and eyes, like ears and legs, play a part in so many operations that a man could only be said not to need them if he had no wants at all.

Foot argues that the virtues, like hands and eyes in the analogy, play so large a part in so many operations that it is implausible to suppose that a committal in a non-naturalist dimension is necessary to demonstrate their goodness.

Philosophers who have supposed that actual action was required if 'good' were to be used in a sincere evaluation have got into difficulties over weakness of will, and they should surely agree that enough has been done if we can show that any man has reason to aim at virtue and avoid vice. But is this impossibly difficult if we consider the kinds of things that count as virtue and vice? Consider, for instance, the cardinal virtues, prudence, temperance, courage and justice. Obviously any man needs prudence, but does he not also need to resist the temptation of pleasure when there is harm involved? And how could it be argued that he would never need to face what was fearful for the sake of some good? It is not obvious what someone would mean if he said that temperance or courage were not good qualities, and this not because of the 'praising' sense of these words, but because of the things that courage and temperance are.

=== Of Weber ===
Philosopher Leo Strauss criticizes Weber for attempting to isolate reason completely from opinion. Strauss acknowledges the philosophical trouble of deriving "ought" from "is", but argues that what Weber has done in his framing of this puzzle is in fact deny altogether that the "ought" is within reach of human reason. Strauss worries that if Weber is right, we are left with a world in which the knowable truth is a truth that cannot be evaluated according to ethical standards. This conflict between ethics and politics would mean that there can be no grounding for any valuation of the good, and without reference to values, facts lose their meaning.

== See also ==
- Baden School – Revival of Immanuel Kant's philosophy
- Empiricism – Idea that knowledge comes only/mainly from sensory experience
- Is–ought problem – Philosophical problem articulated by David Hume
- Non-overlapping magisteria – View of science and religion
- Value-freedom – Max Weber's methodological position
- Positive and normative economics – Study of economics facts and values
- Relativism – Philosophical view rejecting objectivity
- Social science – Branch of science that studies society and its relationships

== Bibliography ==
- Hume, David. A Treatise of Human Nature. 1739–1740
- Hume, David. An Enquiry Concerning Human Understanding. 1748
- Nietzsche, Friedrich. Thus Spoke Zarathustra. 1883–1891. Translated by R.J. Hollingdale. New York: Penguin, 1969
- Weber, Max (1946). "Science as a Vocation". In Gerth, H. H.; Mills, C. Wright (eds.). From Max Weber: Essays in Sociology (PDF). Translated by Gerth, H. H.; Mills, C. Wright. New York: Oxford University Press. pp. 129–156. Archived (PDF) from the original on 14 June 2025.
- Putnam, Hilary (2002). The Collapse of the Fact/Value Dichotomy and Other Essays. Harvard University Press. ISBN 978-0674009059.
- Silvestri P. (ed.), L. Einaudi, On Abstract and Historical Hypotheses and on Value judgments in Economic Sciences, Critical edition with an Introduction and Afterword by Paolo Silvestri, Routledge, London & New York, 2017.
