= Science as a Vocation =

1917 lecture by Max Weber

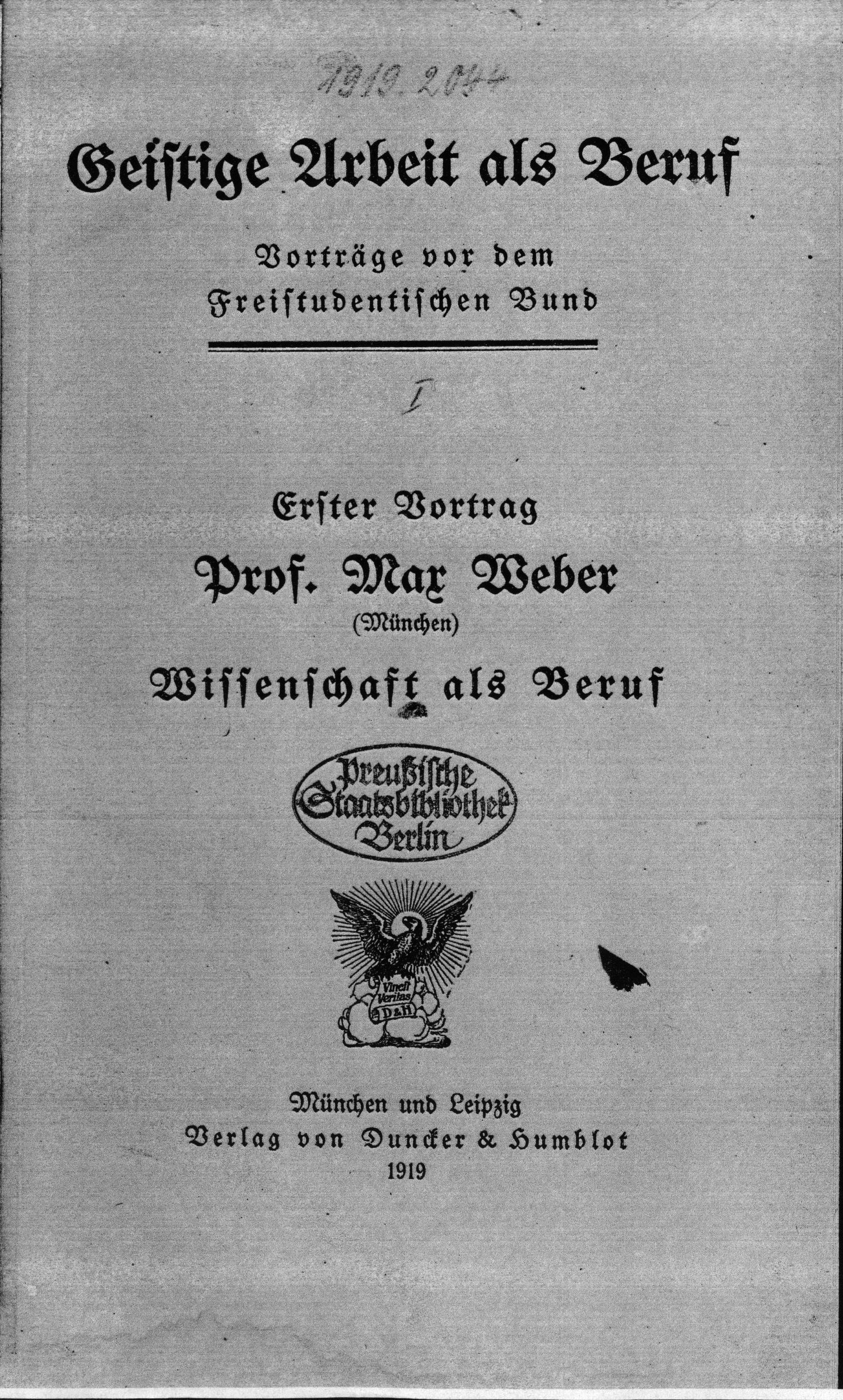
Max Weber – Wissenschaft als Beruf – Seite

"Science as a Vocation" (German: Wissenschaft als Beruf) is the title of a lecture given in 1917 at the Ludwig-Maximilians-Universität München by German sociologist and political economist Max Weber. Weber reportedly delivered the lecture "without notes and without pause". The original version of the text was published in German, and at least two translations in English exist.

Science as a Vocation is the first of the two "Vocation" lectures. The second lecture, "Politics as a Vocation", was also delivered at Ludwig-Maximilians-Universität München, in January 1919.

== Summary ==
In Science as a Vocation, Weber weighed the benefits and detriments of choosing a career as an academic at a university who studies science or humanities. Weber probes the question "what is the value of science?" and focuses on the nature of ethics underpinning the scientific career. Science, to Weber, gives methods of explanation and means of justifying a position, but it cannot explain why that position is worth holding in the first place; this is the task of philosophy. No science is free from suppositions, and the value of a science is lost when its suppositions are rejected.

At one point in the lecture, Weber compares the nature of an artist's work to that of a scientist. He argues that the artist's work can reach fulfillment; the scientist's work, on the other hand, by its very nature, is designed to be surpassed.

Weber reasons that science can never answer the fundamental questions of life, such as directing people on how to live their lives and what to value. Value, he contends, can only be derived from personal beliefs such as religion. He further argues for the separation of reason and faith, noting that each has its place in its respective field but, if crossed over, cannot work.

Weber also separates fact from value in politics. He argues that a teacher should impart knowledge to students and teach them how to clarify issues logically—even political issues—but teachers should never use the classroom to indoctrinate or preach their personal political views (Value-free).

Weber also makes some practical comments about research and teaching. He notes that good scholars can be poor teachers, and that qualities that make one a good scholar, or a good thinker, are not necessarily the same qualities that make for good leaders or role models.

== Dating ==
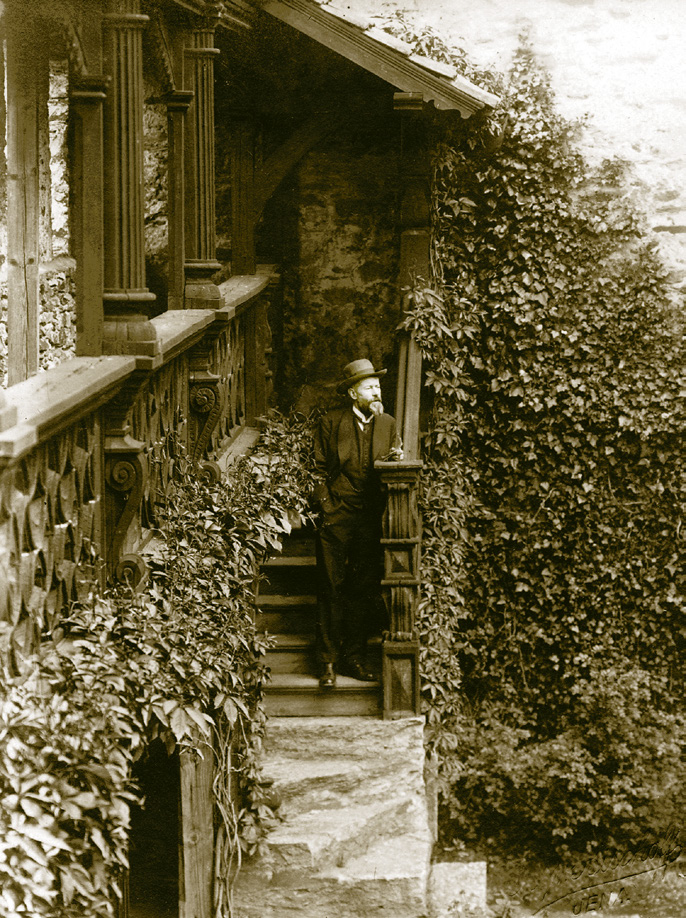
Max Weber in 1917, lecturing at Lauenstein

There has been some debate about when Weber delivered this lecture. Older sources often give the year as 1918. But based on a range of evidence scholars now think that Weber gave these lectures in 1917.

== Translations ==
Weber, Max (1946). Science as Vocation, in From Max Weber, tr. and ed. by H. H. Gerth, and C. Wright Mills. New York: Free press.

Weber, Max (2004). Science as Vocation, in The Vocation Lectures, tr. by Rodney Livingstone, and Edited by David Owen and Tracy Strong (Illinois: Hackett Books).

Weber, Max (2020). Charisma and Disenchantment, tr. Damion Searls and ed. Paul Reitter and Chad Wellmon. (New York: New York Review Books)

== See also ==
- Disenchantment
