= Pro-Truth Pledge =

Promotion to encourage truth and rational thinking

The Pro-Truth Pledge is an initiative promoting truth seeking and rational thinking, particularly in politics.

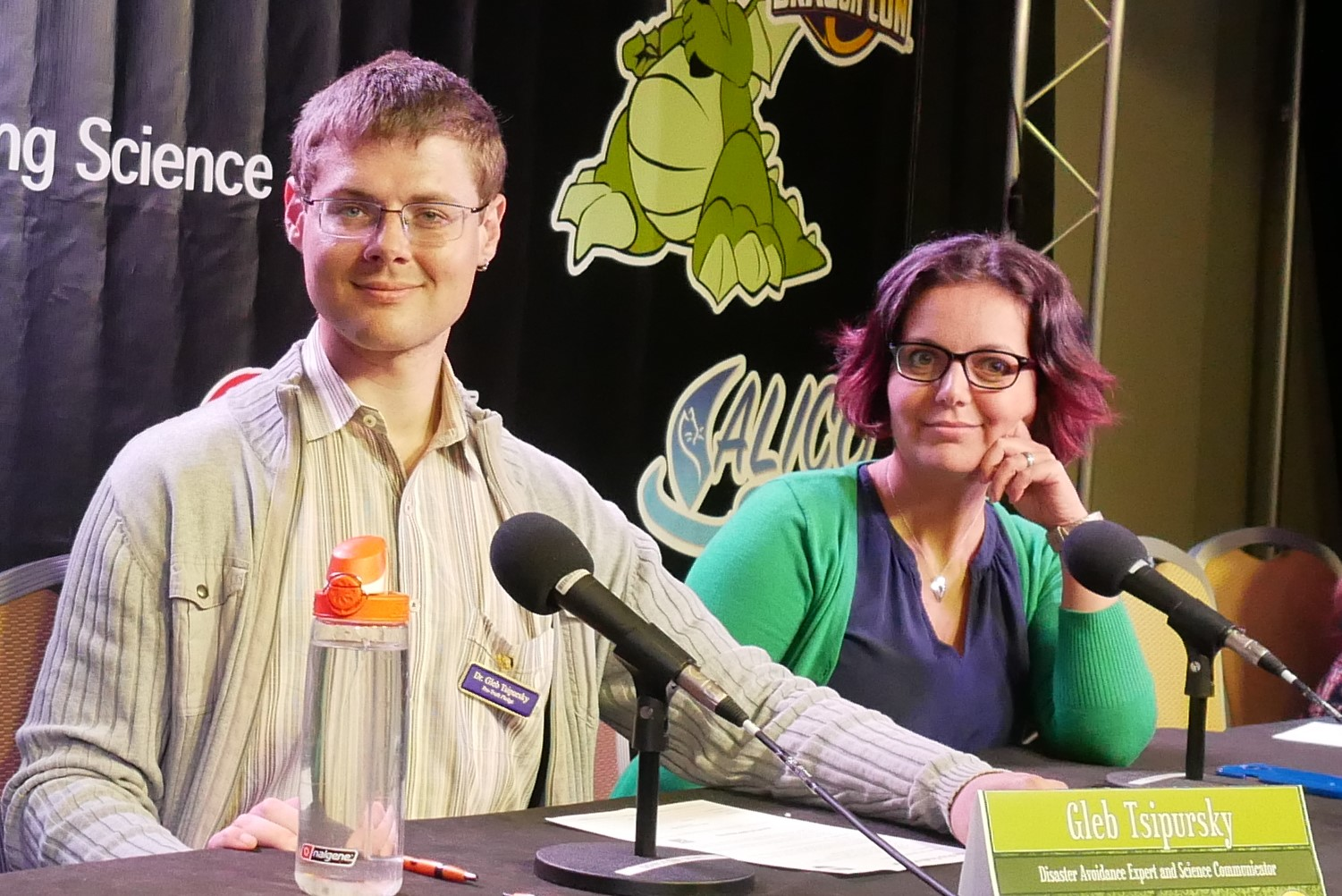
Gleb Tsipursky and Agnes Vishnevkin of the Pro-Truth Pledge speaking at Dragon Con 2018

== History ==
Pledge

I pledge My Earnest Efforts To:

Share truth

- Verify: fact-check information to confirm it is true before accepting and sharing it
- Balance: share the whole truth, even if some aspects do not support my opinion
- Cite: share my sources so that others can verify my information
- Clarify: distinguish between my opinion and the facts

Honor truth

- Acknowledge: acknowledge when others share true information, even when we disagree otherwise
- Reevaluate: reevaluate if my information is challenged, retract it if I cannot verify it
- Defend: defend others when they come under attack for sharing true information, even when we disagree otherwise
- Align: align my opinions and my actions with true information

Encourage truth

- Fix: ask people to retract information that reliable sources have disproved even if they are my allies
- Educate: compassionately inform those around me to stop using unreliable sources even if these sources support my opinion
- Defer: recognize the opinions of experts as more likely to be accurate when the facts are disputed
- Celebrate: celebrate those who retract incorrect statements and update their beliefs toward the truth

First published in December 2016, the pledge is a movement and initiative of the Rational Politics project of Intentional Insights, a nonprofit organization dedicated to promoting rational thinking and good decision making in various areas of life. The Pro-Truth Pledge is partially a reaction (and a would-be answer) to recent political trends in the US and UK, for example to alternative facts, growth of fake news and post-truth politics; all of which are seen by pledgees as acute problems.

== Founders ==
The founders of Pro-Truth Pledge come from its mother organization, Intentional Insights. The behavior and social science methodologies behind the Pro-Truth Pledge were applied to the topic by Gleb Tsipursky, one of the founders of Intentional Insights.

== Supporters and impact ==
According to the project's home page, as of August 26, 2018, there are 8,374 signatories to the pledge, including 85 organizations, 625 government officials, and 850 public figures (including Jonathan Haidt, Michael Shermer, Steven Pinker and Pierre Whalon). The Pro-Truth Pledge has received media coverage.

== Effectiveness ==
At least two peer-reviewed studies have been conducted to determine the effectiveness of taking the Pro-Truth Pledge.

A study published in the journal Behavior and Social Issues examined the sharing of news-related content on Facebook before and after taking the pledge. The findings "suggest that taking the PTP had a statistically significant effect on behavior change in favor of more truthful sharing on Facebook."

Another study, published in the Journal of Social and Political Psychology, used a different methodology and reached a similar conclusion: "taking the pledge results in a statistically significant increase in alignment with the behaviors of the pledge."

== Translations and pledge-takers by geography ==
The pledge has been translated into Spanish, Hungarian, Russian, Ukrainian, Portuguese and German, but the map of the pledge takers shows that most (above 90%) of the pledge takers live in North America, mainly in the US.

== See also ==
- Ideological Turing test – comparable concept
- Social desirability bias – something to worry about when making such a pledge
