= Post-truth politics =

Politics in which facts are considered irrelevant

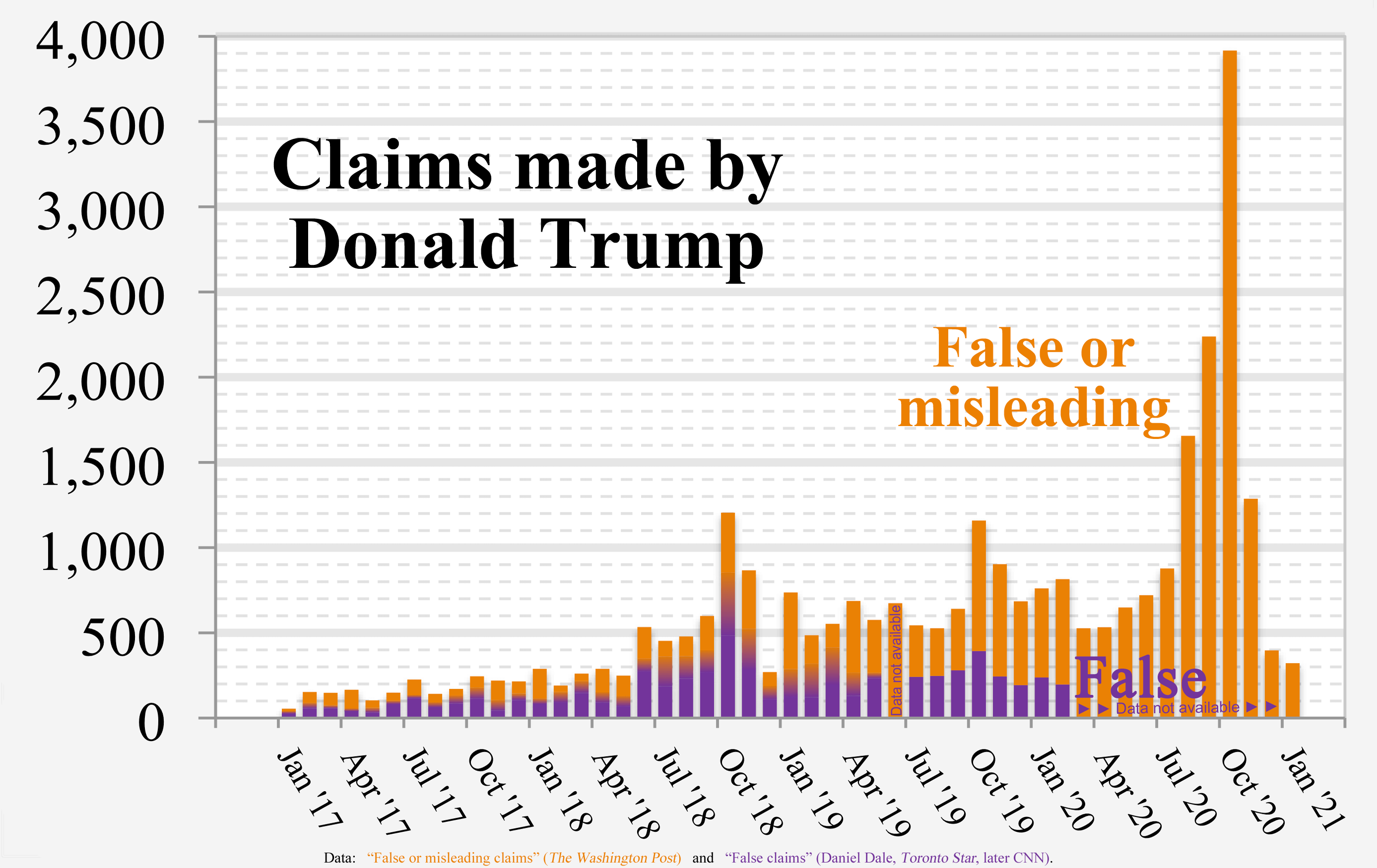

Post-truth politics, also described as post-factual politics or post-reality politics, is a widely recognized historical period where political culture is marked by public anxiety about what claims can be publicly accepted facts, heightened concern over the honesty of public figures, and public's tendency to accept claims that elicit an emotional response and confirm pre-existing beliefs over professionally accepted evidence. Indeed most research demonstrates an increasing disconnect between public opinion and scholarly consensus, which is thought to exemplify the core of the era.

The term is often used pejoratively to describe a dystopian political discourse in which empirical truth is irrelevant, and is forced to compete with false ideas which are given unjust credibility.

The proposed beginning of this period has been subject to discussion, the term post-truth had been used by authors as early as the 1990s.

While related, and sometimes used interchangeably, post-truth politics is a distinct concept from the culture war.

The term broadly refers to the idea that the lay public has become unable to determine what is true and what is false, often due to malicious orchestrators, an idea which has become increasingly entertained by political commentators, as well as psychologists and sociologists. It is regarded as especially being influenced by the arrival of new communication and media technologies. Recognized as a term in the press and various dictionaries, post-truth has also become a pejorative phrase referring to misleading or false claims made by politicians.

Post-truth politics are studied as a media and communication studies phenomenon with particular forms of truth-telling, including intentional rumors, lies, conspiracy theories, and fake news. In the context of media and politics, it often involves the manipulation of information or the spread of misinformation to shape public perceptions and advance political agendas. Deceptive communication, "disinformation, rumor bombs, and fake news have mass communication era antecedents in both war and security (gray propaganda) and commercial communication (advertising and public relations). All can be said to be forms of strategic communication and not mere accidental or innocent misstatements of facts."

Oxford Dictionaries declared that its international word of the year in 2016 was post-truth, citing a 20-fold increase in usage compared to 2015, and noted that it was commonly associated with the noun post-truth politics.

As of 2018, political commentators and academic researchers have identified post-truth politics as ascendant in many nations, notably Australia, Brazil, India, Ghana, Russia, the United Kingdom, and the United States, among others.

== History of terminology ==
The term post-truth politics appears to have developed from other adjectival uses of post-truth, such as post-truth political environment, post-truth world, post-truth era, post-truth society, and very close cousins, such as post-fact society and post-truth presidency. According to Oxford Dictionaries, the Serbian-American playwright Steve Tesich may have been the first to use the term post-truth in a 1992 essay in The Nation. Tesich writes that following the shameful truth of Watergate (1972–1974), more assuaging coverage of the Iran–Contra scandal (1985–1987) and Persian Gulf War (1990–1991) demonstrates that "we, as a free people, have freely decided that we want to live in some post-truth world." However, as Harsin (2018) notes, the term was in academic circulation in the 1990s. The media studies scholar John Hartley used the term post-truth as the title of a chapter, "Journalism in a Post-truth Society", in his 1992 book The Politics of Pictures.

In 2004 Ralph Keyes used the term post-truth era in his book by that title. In it he argued that deception is becoming more prevalent in the current media-driven world. According to Keyes, lies stopped being treated as something inexcusable and started being viewed as something acceptable in certain situations, which supposedly led to the beginning of the post-truth era. The same year American journalist Eric Alterman spoke of a "post-truth political environment" and coined the term the post-truth presidency in his analysis of the misleading statements made by the Bush administration after 9/11 in 2001. More specifically, the American academic Moustafa Bayoumi argued that it was the 2003 "Iraq War that ushered in the post-truth era and that the United States is to blame". Bayoumi believes that there existed differences compared to the times, for example, of the Spanish–American War and of the Gulf of Tonkin incident. Starting from 2002–2003, through the formation of the Office of Special Plans and supported by the neocons' noble lie ideology, the greatest difference from previous time periods of all existed and "the apparatus of lying became institutionalized". In his 2004 book Post-democracy, Colin Crouch used the term post-democracy to mean a model of politics where "elections certainly exist and can change governments", but "public electoral debate is a tightly controlled spectacle, managed by rival teams of professionals expert in the techniques of persuasion, and considering a small range of issues selected by those teams". Crouch directly attributes the "advertising industry model" of political communication to the crisis of trust and accusations of dishonesty that a few years later others have associated with post-truth politics. More recently, scholars have followed Crouch in demonstrating the role of professional political communication's contribution to distrust and wrong beliefs, where strategic use of emotion is becoming key to gaining trust for truth statements.

The term post-truth politics may have originally been coined by the blogger David Roberts in a blog post for Grist on 1 April 2010. Roberts defined it as "a political culture in which politics (public opinion and media narratives) have become almost entirely disconnected from policy (the substance of legislation)". Post truth was used by philosopher Joseph Heath to describe the 2014 Ontario election. The term became widespread during the campaigns for the 2016 presidential election in the United States and for the 2016 "Brexit" referendum on membership in the European Union in the United Kingdom. Following this, some scholars use the term post-truth situation to refer to such "a situation in society and politics, in which the boundary between truth and untruth is erased, facts and related narratives are purposefully produced, emotions are more important than knowledge and the actors of social or political life do not care for truth, proof and evidence".

== Contributing Factors ==
Distrust in major social institutions, political parties, government, news media, and social media, along with the fact that anyone today can create and circulate content that has generic characteristics of news (fake news) creates the conditions for post-truth politics. Distrust is also politically polarized, where those identifying with one political party dislike and distrust those of another. Since distrust also stems from a feeling of lacking truth, the primary factor that contributes to the post-truth era is anxiety surrounding an inability to obtain truth confidently. This is in line with what some argue: that post-truth politics is not truly driven by misinformation, but anxiety over misinformation.

Overall, a variety of factors have been proposed as the primary contributors to the post-truth era.

=== Increased Access to Information ===
The information age has rendered many traditional sources of news or facts inefficient or comparatively expensive. The pros and cons of this have been subject to much discussion, especially in regards to the post-truth era. Many believe that the internet's unique ability to present information created by anybody, to anybody with an internet connection has allowed for greater misinformation to spread.

Another contributing factor to misinformation in the digital age has been the change from long form to short form social media content. On social media platforms such as YouTube, a user will browse a selection of curated content, complete with titles and thumbnails describing the content in the video. This process allows the user to only watch what they volunteer to see. In addition to this, the length of a YouTube video is much greater than other social media, which promotes nuanced explanation and evidence analysis. This contrasts with increasingly popular social media services like TikTok, which presents videos without the discretion of the viewer, and promotes videos which receive interaction in the shortest amount of time possible. These factors promote a lack of production quality in videos, as production value promotes long term attention and initial click through rates rather than immediate engagement with a pre-selected video. This presentation of content causes all videos to feel equally credible, and fosters misinformation.

=== The Illusory Truth Effect ===
The illusory truth effect is the tendency to believe false information to be correct after repeated exposure.

=== Sensational Journalism ===
Sensationalist media has become the primary way through which even credible news organizations interact with the world. The primary drive behind this has likely been intense competition for attention in the information age.

=== Normalization of Conspiracy Theories ===
Conspiracy theories have seen a mainstream recognition unprecedented in modern times. Conspiracy theories are definitionally an assertion of a conspiracy, and are sold as appealing narratives regardless of their truth.

The majority of Americans believe in at least one conspiracy theory. With 75% percent of self identified republicans believing in a conspiracy theory, and 56% of self identified democrats believing in a conspiracy theory.

=== Echo Chambers ===
Echo chambers have seen unprecedented propagation in the digital age, with social media being the driving factor. Social media algorithms have allowed people to be exposed to less and less information contradicting their beliefs.

=== Poor Education ===
The poorly educated fall victim to falsehoods more often than highly educated people.

=== Monetary Value in Promoting Disinformation ===
The monetary value of promoting disinformation, especially with a right-wing, anti-establishment slant has seen major commercial success. A new class of celebrity has often been referred to as "grifters", with prominent figures including Alex Jones, Andrew Wakefield, Graham Hancock, Brian "Liver King" Johnson, Avi Loeb, Bret and Eric Weinstein, and others. These figures have all been widely discredited, and no genuine academics entertain their ideas. Many pseudoscience peddlers have also faced downfall due to legal trouble, like Alex Jones.

A subset of this type is often seen, where media organizations do not directly profit from their peddling of pseudoscience, but see financial investments from corporations with a stake in promoting the misinformation being spread. The most prominent of these organizations is the Daily Wire, which was established with heavy investments from the fracking-baron Wilks brothers. In return for the investments, the organizations then promote messaging beneficial to their investors; for example, the Daily Wire heavily promotes climate change denialism.

=== Emotional Exploitation ===
Emotional reactions require less energy than logical analysis, and therefore, humans are more prone to consider ideas with emotions instead of rationality. Many theories have come about to explain why this bias has only been widely exploited in modern times, but one theory is that the majority of people have some degree of integrity. Individuals who are most likely to lie for personal gain are also the individuals most sensitive to humiliation. It is also heavily stigmatized to tell large, blatant lies, especially in politics. For an individual to both want to manipulate the public, have the ability to shamelessly lie, to ignore claims being falsified, and to have the intelligence to craft appealing, emotional arguments, would be extremely unlikely, and social systems punish this behavior strongly.

== Individual Vulnerabilities ==
Vulnerability to misinformation comes in two forms; either gullibility with respect to poorer information, or distrust and skepticism with respect to better information that might correct it.

A major risk factor is the inability to differentiate between facts and opinions. In a 2024 study from the University of Illinois, 2,500 participants were asked to categorize 12 different statements as being either facts or opinions, and nearly half (45.7%) of the subjects performed no better than a coin flip. One of the coauthors, Jeffery Mondak, explained the significance of the findings in a press release: "What we're showing here is that people have trouble distinguishing factual claims from opinion, and if we don't have this shared sense of reality, then standard journalistic fact-checking – which is more curative than preventative – is not going to be a productive way of defanging misinformation ... How can you have productive discourse about issues if you're not only disagreeing on a basic set of facts, but you're also disagreeing on the more fundamental nature of what a fact itself is?"

At the system level, recent work in political communication has introduced the term epistemic vulnerability to describe broader strains on the informational foundations of democracy, beyond individuals' exposure to misleading information. One cross-national study develops an epistemic vulnerability index combining perceived exposure to disinformation, distrust in professional news media, and self-reported disorientation about distinguishing facts from falsehoods across 20 Western democracies, and reports that countries with stronger public service broadcasting and larger party systems show lower levels of epistemic vulnerability, whereas higher levels of populism, ideological polarization, and political parallelism are associated with higher scores on the index.

== Sentiments Among Journalists ==
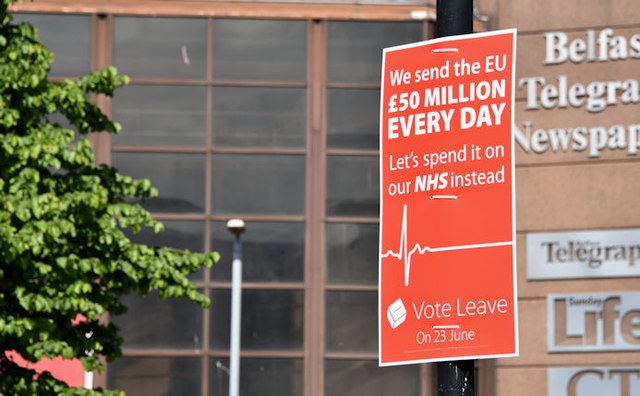
A Vote Leave poster with a contested claim about the EU membership fee, cited as an example of post-truth politics

In modern professionalization of political communication (tied to marketing and advertising research), a defining trait of post-truth politics is that campaigners continue to repeat their talking points, even when media outlets, experts in the field in question, and others provide proof that contradicts these talking points. For example, during campaigning for the British EU referendum campaign, Vote Leave made repeated use of the claim that EU membership cost £350 million a week, although later began to use the figure as a net amount of money sent directly to the EU. This figure, which ignored the UK rebate and other factors, was described as "potentially misleading" by the UK Statistics Authority, as "not sensible" by the Institute for Fiscal Studies, and was rejected in fact checks by BBC News, Channel 4 News and Full Fact. Vote Leave nevertheless continued to use the figure as a centrepiece of their campaign until the day of the referendum, after which point they downplayed the pledge as having been an "example", pointing out that it was only ever suggested as a possible alternative use of the net funds sent to the EU. Tory MP and Leave campaigner Sarah Wollaston, who left the group in protest during its campaign, criticised its "post-truth politics". The justice secretary Michael Gove controversially claimed in an interview that the British people "Had had enough of experts".

Michael Deacon, parliamentary sketchwriter for The Daily Telegraph, summarised the core message of post-truth politics as "Facts are negative. Facts are pessimistic. Facts are unpatriotic." He added that post-truth politics can also include a claimed rejection of partisanship and negative campaigning. In this context, campaigners can push a utopian "positive campaign" to which rebuttals can be dismissed as smears and scaremongering and opposition as partisan.

In its most extreme mode, post-truth politics can make use of conspiracism. In this form of post-truth politics, false rumors (such as the "birther" or "Muslim" conspiracy theories about Barack Obama) become major news topics. In the case of the "pizzagate" conspiracy, this resulted in a man entering the Comet Ping Pong pizzeria and firing an AR-15 rifle.

In contrast to simply telling untruths, writers such as Jack Holmes of Esquire describe the process as something different, with Holmes putting it as: "So, if you don't know what's true, you can say whatever you want and it's not a lie". Finally, scholars have argued that post-truth is not simply about clear cut true/false statements and people's failure to distinguish between them but about strategically ambiguous statements that may be true in some ways, from some perspectives and interpretations, and false in others. This was the case around the disinformation campaigns of the UK and US in promoting the US invasion of Iraq (Saddam Hussein/Al Qaeda "ties" or "links" and Weapons of Mass Destruction), which have been described as watershed moments of the post-truth era.

=== Major news outlets ===
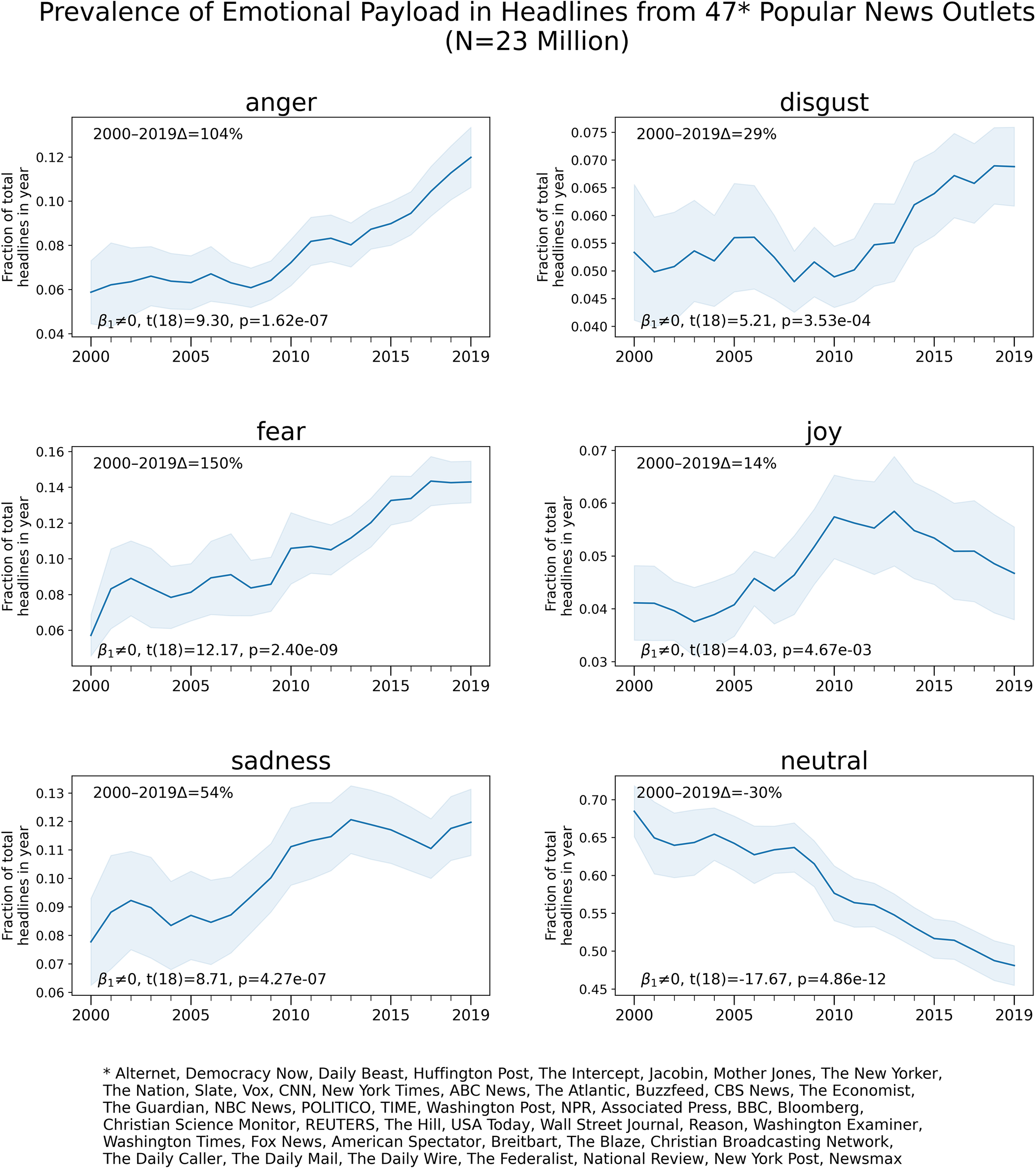
Decline of neutrality and rise in emotionality in large U.S. media news articles headlines since 2000

Several trends in the media landscape have been blamed for the perceived rise of post-truth politics. One contributing factor has been the proliferation of state-funded news agencies like CCTV News and RT, and Voice of America in the US which allow states to influence Western audiences. According to Peter Pomerantsev, a British-Russian journalist who worked for TNT in Moscow, one of their prime objectives has been to de-legitimize Western institutions, including the structures of government, democracy, and human rights. As of 2016, trust in the mainstream media in the US had reached historical lows. It has been suggested that under these conditions, fact checking by news outlets struggles to gain traction among the wider public and that politicians resort to increasingly drastic messaging.

Many news outlets desire to appear to be, or have a policy of being, impartial. Many writers have noted that in some cases, this leads to false balance, the practice of giving equal emphasis to unsupported or discredited claims without challenging their factual basis. The 24-hour news cycle also means that news channels repeatedly draw on the same public figures, which benefits PR-savvy politicians and means that presentation and personality can have a larger impact on the audience than facts, while the process of claim and counter-claim can provide grist for days of news coverage at the expense of deeper analysis of the case.

=== Social media and the Internet ===
The general availability of information on the internet bypassed established media that had an editorial process and professional journalistic and academic discipline which acted as gatekeepers to filter out misinformation. Misinformation that might have been filtered out is now often published in popular, globally accessible forums which enter the marketplace of ideas that liberal democracies depend on for informing their electorate.

Social media adds an additional dimension, as user networks can become echo chambers possibly emphasised by the filter bubble where one political viewpoint dominates and scrutiny of claims fails, allowing a parallel media ecosystem of websites, publishers and news channels to develop, which can repeat post-truth claims without rebuttal. In this environment, post-truth campaigns can ignore fact checks or dismiss them as being motivated by bias. The Guardian editor-in-chief Katherine Viner laid some of the blame on the rise of clickbait, articles of dubious factual content with a misleading headline and which are designed to be widely shared, saying that "chasing down cheap clicks at the expense of accuracy and veracity" undermines the value of journalism and truth. In 2016, David Mikkelson, co-founder of the fact checking and debunking site Snopes.com, described the introduction of social media and fake news sites as a turning point, saying "I'm not sure I'd call it a post-truth age but ... there's been an opening of the sluice-gate and everything is pouring through. The bilge keeps coming faster than you can pump."

The digital culture allows anybody with a computer and access to the internet to post their opinions online and mark them as fact which may become legitimized through echo-chambers and other users validating one another. Content may be judged based on how many views a post gets, creating an atmosphere that appeals to emotion, audience biases, or headline appeal instead of researched fact. Content which gets more views is continually filtered around different internet circles, regardless of its legitimacy. Some also argue that the abundance of fact available at any time on the internet leads to an attitude focused on knowing basic claims to information instead of an underlying truth or formulating carefully thought-out opinions. The Internet allows people to choose where they get their information, often facilitating them to reinforce their own opinions.

Researchers have developed prototypical falsity scores for over 800 contemporary elites on Twitter and associated exposure scores. Various similar countermeasures that are largely based on technical changes or extensions to common platforms and software have been proposed.

In 2017, a rise in national protests sparked against the 2016 United States presidential election and the victory of Donald Trump was attributed to fake news stories posted and shared by millions of users on Facebook. Following this incident, the spread of misinformation was given the word post-truth, a term coined from Oxford Dictionaries as the "word of the year".

=== Polarized political culture ===
The rise of post-truth politics coincides with polarized political beliefs. A Pew Research Center study of American adults found that "those with the most consistent ideological views on the left and right have information streams that are distinct from those of individuals with more mixed political views and very distinct from each other". Data is becoming increasingly accessible as new technologies are introduced to the everyday lives of citizens. An obsession for data and statistics also filters into the political scene, and political debates and speeches become filled with snippets of information that may be misconstrued, false, or not contain the whole picture. Sensationalized television news emphasizes grand statements and further publicizes politicians. This shaping from the media influences how the public views political issues and candidates.

== Donald Trump and Post-Truth Politics ==
Donald Trump is often seen as the embodiment of the post-truth era by the public, journalists, science communicators, and political commentators. The Washington Post has documented >30,000 false or misleading claims made by Donald Trump.

Donald Trump's contribution to the post-truth environment has also been alleged to derive to his follower's holding a strong emotional attachment and sense of personal loyalty, rather than an isolated belief in his trustworthiness. This hypothesis is used to demonstrate the severity of the post-truth era Research into this claim has shown that the majority of Trump supporters are likely to believe a false statement made by Trump with the same confidence, regardless of the degree of accuracy of the actual claim. The same supporters also demonstrated the strongest belief in the same misinformation, even when later demonstrated to be false by the researchers.

Research suggests that Donald Trump has curried strong enough emotional attachment to achieve an effect, where his followers view their own personal identity as innately tied to the identity of Trump.

Though Trump claimed in December 2025 that "inflation has stopped", the consumer price index (CPI) began increasing in the months following his April 2025 announcement of tariffs.

Though Trump on December 9, 2025 rated his economy as "A+++++", the unemployment rate had increased during his second term.

Trump asserted tariffs on Chinese goods in February and April 2025, igniting a trade war that injected uncertainty as China turned to other sources.

Though Trump rated his economy as "A+++++", employment figures showed little change from April through November of his first year.

Upon imposing the highest U.S. tariffs since the Great Depression (called "Liberation Day" in April 2025), Trump claimed that "jobs and factories will come roaring back". However, manufacturing employment declined every month for the rest of the year.

In 2016, the "post-truth" label was especially widely used to describe the presidential campaign of Donald Trump, including by Professor Daniel W. Drezner in The Washington Post, Jonathan Freedland in The Guardian, Chris Cillizza in The Independent, Jeet Heer in The New Republic, and James Kirchick in the Los Angeles Times, and by several professors of government and history at Harvard. In 2017, The New York Times, The Washington Post, and others, began to point out lies or falsehoods in Trump's statements after the election. Former president Barack Obama stated that the new media ecosystem "means everything is true and nothing is true".

== Dissenting views ==
Unlike some academic treatments of post-truth that see it as historically specific and closely associated with shifts in journalism, social trust, and new media and communication technologies, several popular commentators (pundits and journalists), equating post-truth with lying or sensational news, have proposed that post-truth is an imprecise or misleading term and/or should be abandoned. In an editorial, New Scientist suggested "a cynic might wonder if politicians are actually any more dishonest than they used to be", and hypothesized that "fibs once whispered into select ears are now overheard by everyone". David Helfand argues, following Edward M. Harris, that "public prevarication is nothing new" and that it is the "knowledge of the audience" and the "limits of plausibility" within a technology-saturated environment that have changed. We are, rather, in an age of misinformation where such limits of plausibility have vanished and where everyone feels equally qualified to make claims that are easily shared and propagated. The writer George Gillett has suggested that the term post-truth mistakenly conflates empirical and ethical judgements, writing that the supposedly "post-truth" movement is in fact a rebellion against "expert economic opinion becoming a surrogate for values-based political judgements".

Toby Young, writing for The Spectator, called the term a "cliché" used selectively primarily by left-wing commentators to attack what are actually universal ideological biases, contending that "[w]e are all post-truthers and probably always have been". The Economist has called this argument "complacent", however, identifying a qualitative difference between political scandals of previous generations, such as those surrounding the Suez Crisis and the Iran–Contra affair (which involved attempting to cover-up the truth) and contemporary ones in which public facts are simply ignored. Similarly, Alexios Mantzarlis of the Poynter Institute said that political lies were not new and identified several political campaigns in history which would now be described as "post-truth". For Mantzarlis, the "post-truth" label was—to some extent—a "coping mechanism for commentators reacting to attacks on not just any facts, but on those central to their belief system", but also noted that 2016 had been "an acrimonious year for politics on both sides of the Atlantic". Mantzarlis also noted that interest in fact checking had never been higher, suggesting that at least some reject "post-truth" politics.

In addition, The Guardian's Kathryn Viner notes that while false news and propaganda are rampant, social media is a double-edged sword. While it has helped some untruths to spread, it has also restrained others; as an example, she said The Sun's false "The Truth" story following the Hillsborough disaster, and the associated police cover-up, would be hard to imagine in the social media age.

== By country ==
Post-truth politics has been applied as a political buzzword to a wide range of political cultures; one article in The Economist identified post-truth politics in Austria, Germany, North Korea, Poland, Russia, Turkey, the United Kingdom, and the United States.

=== Australia ===
The repeal of carbon pricing by the government of Tony Abbott was described as "the nadir of post-truth politics" by The Age.

=== Germany ===
In December 2016 postfaktisch (lit. 'post-factual') was named word of the year by the Gesellschaft für deutsche Sprache (German language society), also in connection with a rise of right-wing populism from 2015 on. Since the 1990s, "post-democracy" was used in sociology more and more.

=== Ghana ===
In Ghana, Coker and Afriyie delved into the prevalence of post-truth politics in the Ghanaian context, with a specific focus on publications in print newspapers affiliated with the country's major political parties, the New Patriotic Party and the National Democratic Congress. The authors highlighted that post-truth practices have become ingrained in the fabric of election campaigns and political discourse in sub-Saharan Africa, including Ghana. Their research aimed to dissect the post-truth strategies employed by Ghanaian politicians affiliated with these two prominent parties, as manifested in their respective politically aligned newspapers, namely The Daily Statesman and The Enquirer. Coker and Afriyie identified three distinct strategies within this context, which they labeled as kairos, disinformation/misinformation, and the deliberate transmission of strategic falsehoods. These strategies were found to be actively shaping political narratives and public perceptions.

=== India ===
Amulya Gopalakrishnan, columnist for The Times of India, identified similarities between the Trump and Brexit campaigns on the one hand, and hot-button issues in India such as the Ishrat Jahan case and the ongoing case against Teesta Setalvad on the other, where accusations of forged evidence and historical revisionism have resulted in an "ideological impasse".

=== Indonesia ===
Post-truth politics have been discussed in Indonesia since at least 2016. In September 2016, the incumbent governor of Jakarta Basuki Tjahaja Purnama, during a speech to citizens of Thousand Islands, said that some citizens were being "deceived using Verse 51 of Al Maidah and other things", referring to a verse of the Quran used by his political opponents. The video was later edited to omit a single word, misrepresenting his statement and instigating a political scandal that resulted in a blasphemy charge and two-year imprisonment. Since this event, post-truth politics have played a more significant role in political campaigns, as well as interactions between Indonesian voters. Yoseph Wihartono, researcher in criminology at the University of Indonesia, identified social media outlets and "internet mobbing" as sources of post-truth dynamics that have potentially "opened wide" the opportunity for religious populism to expand.

=== South Africa ===
Health care and education in South Africa was substantially compromised during the presidency of Thabo Mbeki due to his HIV/AIDS denialism.

=== United Kingdom ===
An early use of the phrase in British politics was in March 2012 by Scottish Labour MSP Iain Gray in criticising the difference between Scottish National Party's claims and official statistics. Scottish Labour leader Jim Murphy also described an undercurrent of post-truth politics in which people "cheerfully shot the messenger" when presented with facts that did not support their viewpoint, seeing it among pro-independence campaigners in the 2014 Scottish independence referendum, and Leave campaigners in the then-upcoming EU membership referendum.

Post-truth politics has been retroactively identified in the lead-up to the Iraq War, particularly after the Chilcot Report, published in July 2016, concluded that Tony Blair misrepresented military intelligence to support his view that Iraq's chemical weapons program was advanced.

The phrase became widely used during the 2016 UK EU membership referendum to describe the Leave campaign. Faisal Islam, political editor for Sky News, said that Michael Gove used "post-fact politics" that were imported from the Trump campaign; in particular, Gove's comment in an interview that "I think people in this country have had enough of experts..." was singled out as illustrative of a post-truth trend, although this is only part of a longer statement. Similarly, Arron Banks, the founder of the unofficial Leave.EU campaign, said that "facts don't work ... You've got to connect with people emotionally. It's the Trump success." Andrea Leadsom—a prominent campaigner for Leave in the EU referendum and one of the two final candidates in the Conservative leadership election—has been singled out as a post-truth politician, especially after she denied having disparaged rival Theresa May's childlessness in an interview with The Times in spite of transcript evidence.

=== United States ===
Donald Trump's opposition to wind power involves repeated claims that "windmills" "kill the birds", but cats in the U.S. actually kill on the order of 10,000 times as many birds as wind turbines.

In conjunction with the rise of new media and communication technologies (especially the Internet and blogging) and the professionalization of political communication (political consulting), scholars have viewed the periods following 9/11 and the George W. Bush administration's strategic communication as a seminal moment in the emergence of what has subsequently been called post-truth politics, before the term and concept exploded in public visibility in 2016. The Bush administration's talking points about "links" or "ties" between Saddam Hussein and Al Qaeda (repeated in parallel by the Tony Blair government), and Hussein's alleged possession of Weapons of Mass Destruction (both highly contested by experts at the time or later disproven and shown to be misleading) were viewed by some scholars as part of a historical shift. Despite age-old precedents of political and government lying (such as the systematic lying by the U.S. government documented in the Pentagon Papers), these propaganda efforts were seen as more sophisticated in their organization and execution in a new media age, part of a complicated new public communication culture (between a wide number of cable and satellite TV, online, and legacy news media sources). In the U.S., the distrust and deception identified with strategic communication of Karl Rove, George W. Bush, and Donald Rumsfeld, among others, were a close historical precedent to controversies around truth (as accuracy and/or honesty) that entered the media agenda of U.S. public life, drawing significant news and new media attention and producing measurable confusion and false belief. The most spectacular examples studied by scholars include the presidential candidacy of John Kerry in 2004 (accusations by the Republican consultant-directed "Swift boat Veterans for Truth" that he lied about his war record) and then, several years later (prior to the 2008 U.S. presidential campaign), that then candidate Barack Obama was a Muslim, despite his declaration that he was Christian, and was using a fake birth certificate (allegedly born in Kenya).

In its original formulation, the phrase "post-truth politics" was used to describe the paradoxical situation in the United States where the Republican Party, which enforced stricter party discipline than the Democratic Party, was nevertheless able to present itself as more bipartisan, since individual Democrats were more likely to support Republican policies than vice versa.

The term was used by Paul Krugman in The New York Times to describe Mitt Romney's 2012 presidential campaign in which certain claims—such as that Barack Obama had cut defense spending and that he had embarked on an "apology tour"—continued to be repeated long after they had been debunked. Other forms of scientific denialism in modern US politics include the anti-vaxxer movement, and the belief that existing genetically modified foods are harmful despite a strong scientific consensus that no currently marketed GMO foods have any negative health effects. The health freedom movement in the US resulted in the passage of the bipartisan Dietary Supplement Health and Education Act of 1994, which allows the sale of dietary supplements without any evidence that they are safe or effective for the purposes consumers expect, though the FDA has begun regulation of homeopathic products.

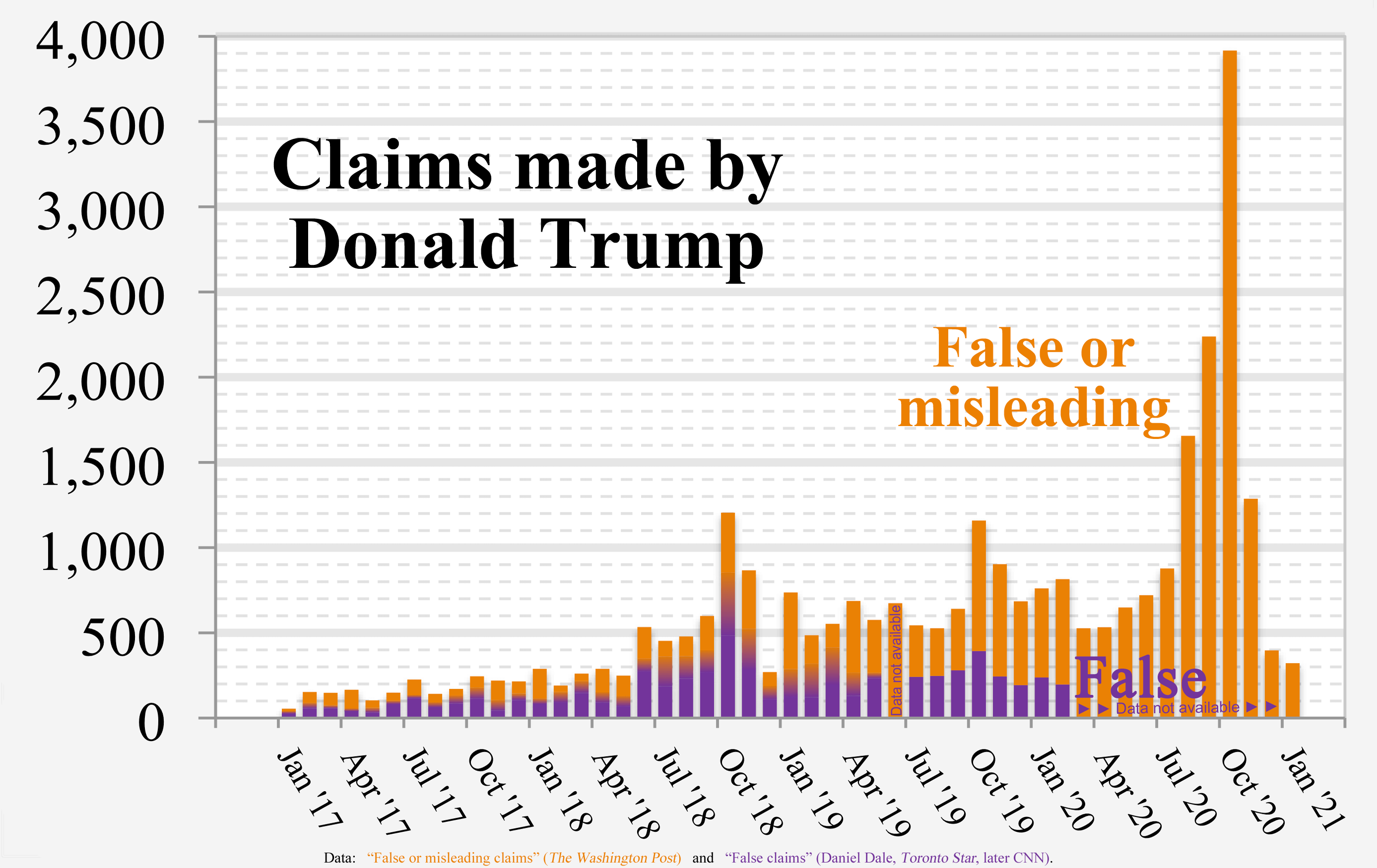
Fact-checkers from The Washington Post, the Toronto Star, and CNN compiled data on "false or misleading claims", and "false claims", respectively. The Post reported 30,573 false or misleading claims in four years, an average of more than 20.9 per day.

To sow election doubt, Trump escalated use of "rigged election" and "election interference" statements in advance of the 2024 election compared to the previous two elections—the statements described as part of a "heads I win; tails you cheated" rhetorical strategy.

Through early October 2026, Trump had attacked the integrity of US elections on more than 70% of the days following his 2025 inauguration, repeatedly making false claims.

In a review for the Harvard Gazette, Christopher Robichaud—a lecturer in ethics and public policy at Harvard Kennedy School—described conspiracy theories about the legitimacy of elections and politicians, such as the "birther" idea that Barack Obama is not a natural-born US citizen, as one side-effect of post-truth politics. Robichaud also contrasted the behavior of the candidates with that following the contested result of the 2000 election, in which Al Gore conceded and encouraged his supporters to accept the result of Bush v. Gore. Similarly, Rob Boston, writing for The Humanist saw a rise in conspiracy theories across US public life, including Birtherism, climate change denialism, and rejecting evolution, which he identified as a result of post-truth politics, noting that the existence of extensive and widely available evidence against these conspiracy theories had not slowed their growth.

==== Political "facts" ====
Newt Gingrich, a prominent American politician and Trump supporter, in an interview with CNN reporter Alisyn Camerota aired July 22, 2016, explained that facts based on the feelings of the electorate were more important in a political campaign than the statistics collected by a reliable government agency are:

- "CAMEROTA: They feel it, yes, but the facts don't support it.
- GINGRICH: As a political candidate, I'll go with how people feel and I'll let you go with the theoreticians."

Supporters of those who are publishing or asserting things that are not true do not necessarily believe them, but have accepted that that is how the game is played.

==== Environmental politics ====
Although the consensus among scientists is that human activities contribute to global warming, several political parties around the world have made climate change denial a basis of their policies. These parties have been accused of using post-truth techniques to attack environmental measures meant to combat climate changes to benefit industry donors. In the wake of the 2016 election, the United States saw numerous climate change deniers rise to power, such as new Environmental Protection Agency head Scott Pruitt replacing Barack Obama's appointee Gina McCarthy.

== Scholarly Discourse On Post-Truth Terminology ==
Scholars and popular commentators disagree about whether post-truth is a label that is newly generated but can be applied to phenomena such as lying in any historical period; or whether it is historically specific, with empirically more recent observable causes (especially new social and political relations enabled by new digital communication technologies) and is only simplistically reduced to the age-old phenomenon of political lying. Scholars and popular commentators also disagree about the degree to which emotion should be emphasized in theories of post-truth, despite the emphasis on emotion in the Oxford Dictionary's original definition of the word. While the term post-truth had no dictionary entry before Oxford Dictionaries' entry in 2016, the Oxford entry was inspired by the outcomes of the Brexit referendum and the 2016 U.S. presidential campaign; it was thus already implicitly referring to politics. Further, in the original Oxford Dictionaries' entry's (even today, more of a press release than traditional dictionary entry) justification for their choice, they say that it is often used in noun form of "post-truth politics". Thus, post-truth is often used interchangeably with post-truth politics.

Post-truth politics is a subset of the broader term post-truth, whose use precedes the recent focus on political events. While Oxford Dictionaries influentially named post-truth its 2016 word-of-the-year, current academic development of post-truth as a concept does not entirely reflect their original emphasis on "circumstances" where appeals to "objective facts" fail to influence as much as "appeals to emotion and personal belief" (see "Drivers" section below). The use of post-truth communication as a major tool in political campaigns such as the Brexit debate in the UK and the Trump campaign in the United States resulted in intense scholarly and journalistic interest in it as an aspect of politics. The existence of "post-truth politics" as a concept that makes sense and as a problem in the political life of liberal democracies is sometimes denied by critics.

Some uses of the concept are more general, referring not to historical conditions of widely empirically documented distrust or a context of promotional capitalism, easily accessible and hard-to-control amateur mass communication of social media, but to the presence of lying and distrust in politics and bias in journalism (and commentators' opinions that people of the day were distrustful or that political lying was common). Reducing the concept of post-truth to dishonest political communication and different styles thereof, some scholars argue that what one identifies as post-truth politics today is really a return of previous periods of politics. Some argue that what is being called "post-truth" is a return to 18th- and 19th-century political and media practthe United States, followed by a period in the 20th century where the media was relatively balanced and political rhetoric was toned down. Such a view nonetheless also conflicts with those in other countries at other times. For example, in 1957 scientist Kathleen Lonsdale remarked in the British context that "for many people truthfulness in politics has now become a mocices in kery.... Anyone who listens to the radio in a mixed company of thinking people knows how deep-seated is this cynicism." Similarly, New Scientist characterised the pamphlet wars that arose with the growth of printing and literacy, beginning in the 1600s, as an early form of post-truth politics. Slanderous and vitriolic pamphlets were cheaply printed and widely disseminated, and the dissent that they fomented contributed to starting wars and revolutions such as the English Civil War (1642–1652) and (much later) the American Revolution (1765–1791).

The "circumstances" surrounding post-truth (politics) noted by the original Oxford Dictionaries' definition have been expanded to denote a historical period, defined by the convergence of numerous empirically documented shifts. Early commentators described it as a long-standing part of political life that was less notable before the advent of the internet and related social changes, several scholars point to a host of empirical changes that are contemporary and are the core of the concept.

== Solutions ==
Political scientists Alfred Moore (University of York), Carlo Invernizzi-Accetti (City University of New York), Elizabeth Markovits (Mount Holyoke College), and Zeynep Pamuk (St John's College), evaluated American historian Sophia A. Rosenfeld's book, Democracy and Truth: A Short History (2019) and its potential solutions for dealing with post-truth politics, in what Invernizzi-Accetti calls "remedies for the growing split between populism and technocracy in contemporary democratic regimes". Rosenfeld highlights seven potential solutions to the problem of post-truth politics: an ethical commitment to truth-telling and fact-checking in public; a proscription against reopening settled debates; a crackdown on disinformation by social media companies; a shift away from free-speech absolutism; protecting the integrity of political institutions; improving information literacy with education; and the support of nonviolent protest against lying and corruption. Invernizzi-Accetti criticizes Rosenfeld's solutions, as he does not see the value of truth in politics. "Truth functions politically as a justification of authority", writes Invernizzi-Accetti, "whereas self-government is predicated on its exclusion from the political domain – it follows that any attempt to construe democracy as a 'regime of truth' is ultimately bound to contradict itself." In response, Rosenfeld writes, "truth is bound always to be a problematic intrusion into any democracy", and that "skepticism is indeed intrinsic to democracy." Alfred Moore responds to Rosenfeld's proposal noting that "solutions will not come from the better organization and communication of knowledge, whether popular or expert, nor from institutions and practices of competition and interaction between them, but from the generation of substantive relations of common interest and mutual commitment".

== See also ==
- Agnotology – Study of culturally induced ignorance or doubt
- Alternative facts – Expression associated with political misinformation established in 2017
- Antiscience – Attitudes that reject science and the scientific method
- "Art, Truth and Politics" (Nobel lecture)
- Big lie – Propaganda technique
- Consensus theory of truth – Concept in epistemology
- Dark Enlightenment – Anti-democratic, reactionary philosophy
- Doublespeak Award – Ironic award given to deceptive public speakers
- Fact checking – Process of verifying information in non-fictional text
- Fake news website – Website that deliberately publishes hoaxes and disinformation
- False or misleading statements by Donald Trump
- Firehosing – Propaganda technique
- Half-truth – Deceptive statement
- Hyperreality – Term for cultural process of shifting ideas of reality
- Lying in politics
- On Bullshit – Philosophical essay by Harry Frankfurt
- Orwellian – Adjective derived from the author George Orwell
- Politics and the English Language – 1946 essay by George Orwell
- Post-truth – Concept regarding objective facts
- Pro-Truth Pledge – Promotion to encourage truth and rational thinking
- Reactionary modernism – Political ideology
- Reality-based community – Derisive term for certain people
- Reliability of Wikipedia
- Swiftboating – Character assassination as a political tactic
- Truthiness – Belief in truth based on only intuition
- Trumpism – American right-wing to far-right populist political ideology
- Truth sandwich – Technique in journalism
- Why Leaders Lie (book)
