= Politics as a Vocation =

1919 essay by Max Weber

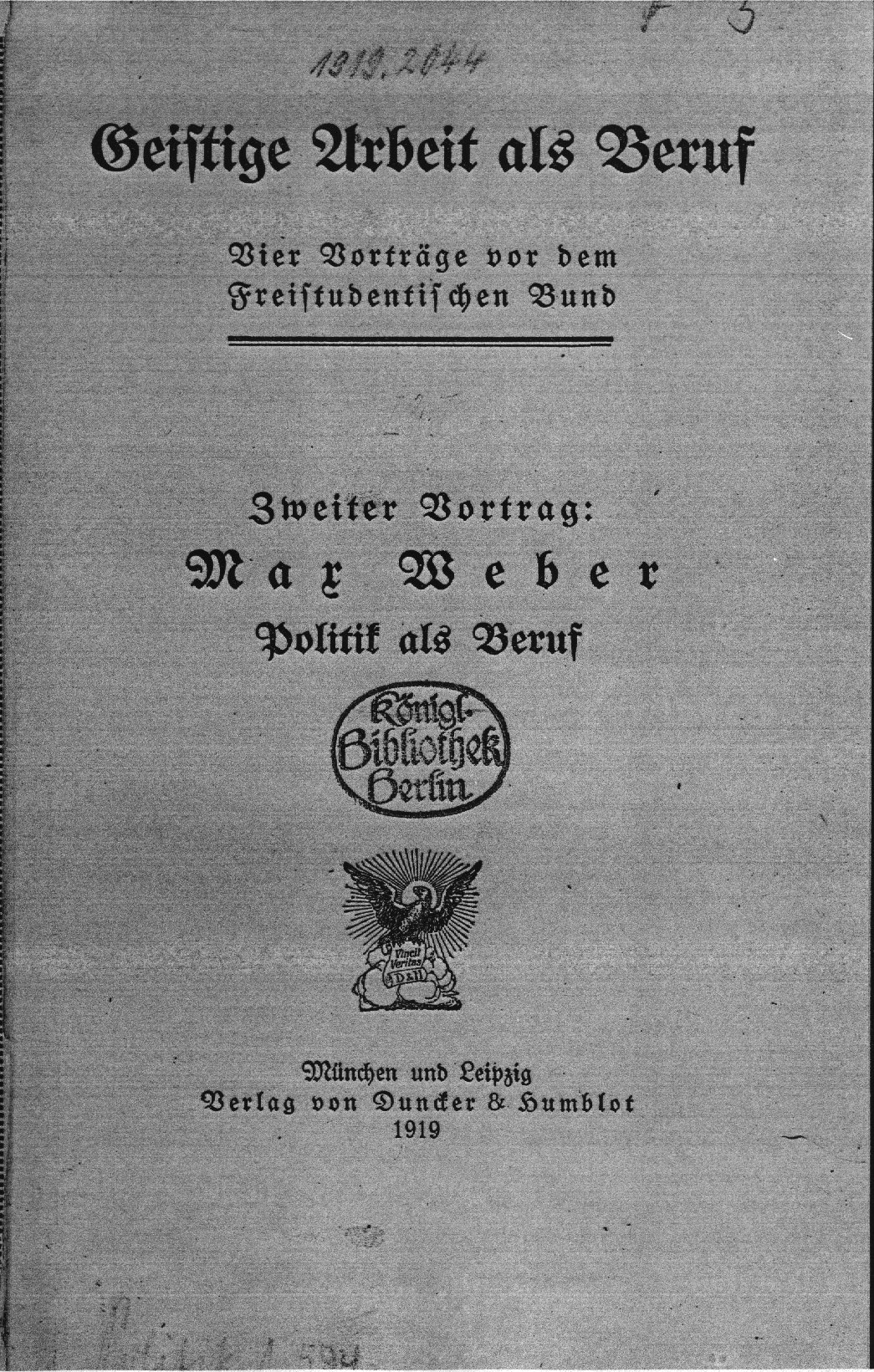
Politics as a Vocation

"Politics as a Vocation" (German: Politik als Beruf) is an essay by German economist and sociologist Max Weber (1864–1920). It originated in the second lecture of a series (the first was "Science as a Vocation") he gave in Munich to the "Free (i.e. Non-incorporated) Students Union" of Bavaria on 28 January 1919. This happened during the German Revolution when Munich itself was briefly the capital of the Bavarian Soviet Republic. Weber gave the speech based on handwritten notes which were transcribed by a stenographer. The essay was published in an extended version in July 1919, and translated into English only after World War II. The essay is today regarded as a classic work of political science and sociology.

== Summary ==
Weber defines the following: "The state is seen as the sole grantor of the 'right' to physical force. Therefore, 'politics' in our case would mean the pursuit for a portion of power or for influencing the division of power whether it is between states, or between groups of people which the state encompasses." Following this definition, Weber notes that there are three principles justifying the legitimacy of political domination of the state: traditional authority, charismatic authority, and legal authority.

Much of the middle part of "Politics as a Vocation" consists of Weber's definitions of charisma and leaders, and of the type of people who are called to the profession of politics. This is developed by lengthy historical descriptions of how modern politics emerged. Emphasis is placed on the historical examples of Great Britain, the United States, and Germany, though examples from France, China, Rome, Ancient Greece, and elsewhere are mentioned. In developing these examples, Weber demonstrates the extent of his grasp of comparative historical research. To do this, Weber describes the relationship between politicians, political parties, and the bureaucracies they create. In this section, Weber's writing in "Politics as a Vocation" is similar to his writing in another of his well-known essays, "Bureaucracy."

In the final section of "Politics as a Vocation", Weber returns to the description of the politician. His main point is that the politician needs to balance an "Ethic of Moral Conviction" with an "Ethic of Responsibility." The Ethic of Moral Conviction refers to the core unshakeable beliefs that a politician must hold. The Ethic of Responsibility refers to the day-to-day need to use the means of the state's violence in a fashion which preserves the peace for the greater good. A politician, Weber writes, must make compromises between these two ethics.

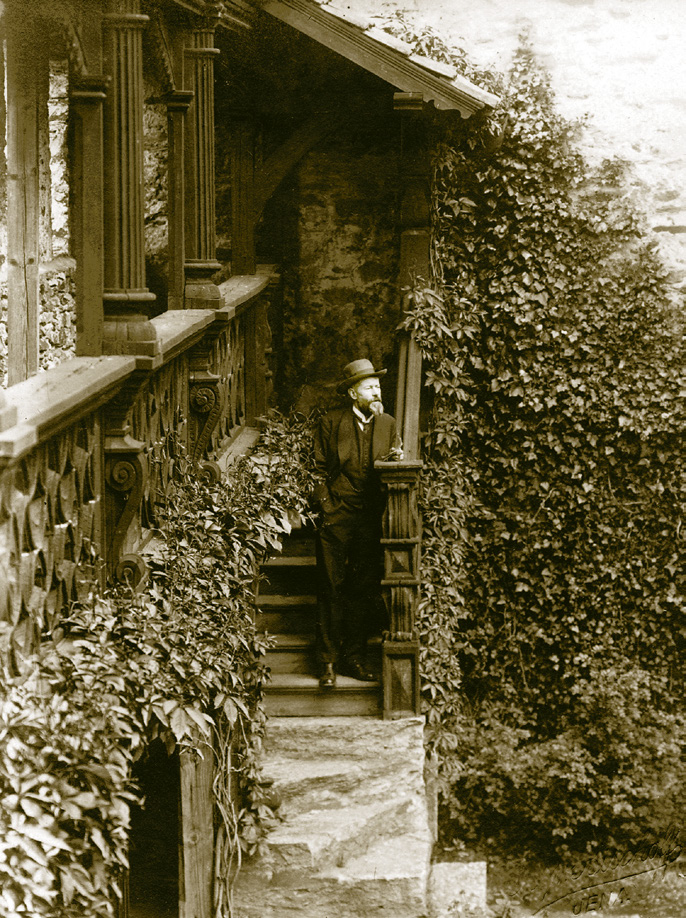
Max Weber in 1917, lecturing at Lauenstein

To do this, Weber writes, "Politics is made with the head, not with the other parts of body, nor the soul". The most effective politician is one who can excite the emotions of the people who follow, while governing strictly with a cold hard reason—the head. But, he believes, this is a task normal humans cannot do, because they are vain.

Weber writes that vanity creates unique problems for politicians because they do indeed control the tools of legitimate violence. Common vanity, Weber writes, means that politicians are tempted to make decisions based on emotional attachments to followers and sycophants, and not on the rational reasoning needed to govern justly and effectively. Weber finds this to be a common characteristic among politicians. As a result, Weber claims, the danger of politics is rooted in the relationship of the politician to the means of violence which are intrinsic to the state, and which will be misused by any vain politician. This is why Weber emphasizes that the practice of politics is so difficult, and not a task for someone who seeks salvation for their eternal soul through the practice of peace and brotherhood. In developing these points, he makes reference to the two kingdoms doctrine of Martin Luther, and the holy Hindu Upanishads.

In the concluding sentences of the essay, Weber comments on the German Revolution of 1919 which was underway when he wrote the essay. He gloomily predicts that the emotional excitement of the moment in 1919 will bring only "polar nights with an icy darkness and harshness, no matter what group will successfully seize power at present". He concludes:

Politics is a strong and slow boring of hard boards. It takes both passion and perspective. Certainly all historical experience confirms the truth—that man would not have attained the possible unless time and again he had reached out for the impossible. But to do that a man must be a leader, and not only a leader but a hero as well, in a very sober sense of the word. And even those who are neither leaders nor heroes must arm themselves with that steadfastness of heart which can brave even the crumbling of all hopes. This is necessary right now, or else men will not be able to attain even that which is possible today. Only he has the calling for politics who is sure that he shall not crumble when the world from his point of view is too stupid or too base for what he wants to offer. Only he who in the face of all this can say 'In spite of all!' has the 'calling' [den 'Beruf'] for politics.

== Three grounds for legitimate rule ==
Weber defines politics for the purposes of the essay as "... leadership, or the exercise of influence on the leadership, of a political association, which today means state." The "state" serves as the placeholder for the analysis of political organizations. The grounds for the legitimate rule of these political organizations, according to Weber, fall into three major categories, or types:

Traditional Authority
The authority of "eternal past," based on habit. Weber defines custom as largely patriarchal, patrimonial, and traditional in scope.
Charisma Authority (Gift of Grace)
The authority of the "revelations, heroism, or other leadership qualities of an individual". Associated with "charisma" of prophets, demagogues, and popular vote.
Legal Authority
Legal rational authority, legality based on valid statutes which are enforced by technically trained civil servants. Legal authority assumes a rational competence and conditioned obedience of both the civil servants and the people to the legal apparatus.

== The two forms of the state ==
Weber focuses his analysis on "political organizations", i.e. "states", and identifies two general forms of the state, supposedly encompassing all state forms at the most general level:

1. The administrative staff beneath the ruler in status and power has its own means of administration separate from those of the ruler. This can include various forms of wealth and possessions, as well as means of production and control over labor. This administrative staff is essentially aristocratic, subdivided into distinct estates;
2. The administrative staff is completely or partially separated from the actual tools of administration, similar to Marx's conception of how the proletariat is separated from the means of production. This staff become confidants without means in a patriarchal organization of deference and delegation.

Weber delineates two different ideas of the "state" based on the relationship between the administrators and their access to the actual means of administration. The first form is "patrimonialism" and dependent on the personality of the ruler, and the loyalty of his followers. There is no emphasis on technical capacity as there is in the second form of the state, which is considered to be modern. In the modern form, the administrators do not personally own the money, buildings, and organizations they direct. Executive decisions often remain with political figures, even though they do not have the technical ability that the modern professional administrators do.

== Translations ==
"Politik als Beruf" has been translated into English at least five times, in:

- Weber, Max (1946). From Max Weber, tr. and ed. Hans Gerth and C. Wright Mills. (New York: Free Press)
- Weber, Max (1978). Weber: Selections in Translation, tr. E. Matthews and ed. W.G. Runciman (Cambridge: Cambridge U.P.)
- Weber, Max (2004). The Vocation Lectures, tr. Rodney Livingstone and ed. David Owen and Tracy Strong (Illinois: Hackett Books).
- Weber, Max (2015). Weber's Rationalism and Modern Society, tr. and ed. Tony Waters and Dagmar Waters (New York: Palgrave Macmillan); as "Politics as Vocation".
- Weber, Max (2020). Charisma and Disenchantment, tr. Damion Searls and ed. Paul Reitter and Chad Wellmon. (New York: New York Review Books)

== See also ==
- Verstehen
