= List of philosophical concepts =

List of philosophical concepts contains a listing of all major ideas across major philosophical traditions.

== A ==
- A priori and a posteriori
- A series and B series
- Abductive reasoning
- Ability
- Absolute
- Absolute time and space
- Abstract and concrete
- Adiaphora
- Aesthetic emotions
- Aesthetic interpretation
- Aesthetics
- Agathology
- Agathusia and aschimothusia
- Agency
- Alief
- All men are created equal
- Analogy
- Analytic–synthetic distinction
- Anthropic principle
- Antinomy
- Antinomian
- Apeiron
- Arborescent
- Art
- Artha
- Atman
- Aufheben
- Autonomy
- Avant-garde
- Avatar
- Avadhuta
- Axiom

== B ==
- Beauty
- Being
- Belief
- Binary opposition
- Bioethics
- Biofact
- Biopolitics
- Body without organs
- Boltzmann brain
- Boredom
- Brahman
- Brahmanda
- Brain in a vat
- Brute fact

== C ==
- Cambridge change
- Camp
- Cartesian Self
- Categorical imperative
- Categorization
- Category of being
- Causal adequacy principle
- Causality
- Chakra
- Character
- Charvaka
- Chaitanya
- Choice
- Civic virtue
- Class
- Class consciousness
- Class struggle
- Cogito ergo sum
- Cognitive bias
- Cognitive closure
- Commensurability
- Common good
- Common sense
- Composition of causes
- Compossibility
- Conatus
- Concept
- Condition of possibility
- Conjecture
- Conscience
- Consent
- Construct
- Contingency
- Cooperative principle
- Creativity
- Crazy wisdom
- Cultural hegemony
- Cultural sensibility
- Culture
- Cuteness

== D ==
- Daimonic
- Darshana
- Dasein
- Death
- Deconstruction
- De dicto and de re
- Deductive reasoning
- Definition
- Demarcation problem
- Deontology
- Depiction
- Descriptive knowledge
- Desert
- Desiring-production
- Dharma
- Dhyana
- Dialectic
- Diksha
- Disciplinary institution
- Discourse
- Disgust
- Distributive justice
- Distrust
- Documentality
- Dogma
- Doxastic logic
- Duty
- Determinism

== E ==
- Ecotechnics
- Ecstasy
- Efficient cause
- Egocentric presentism
- Egoism
- Elegance
- Embodied cognition
- Emergence
- Empirical method
- Empirical relationship
- Empirical research
- Entertainment
- Entity
- Epiphenomenalism
- Epistemic injustice
- Epistemic justification
- Epistemic possibility
- Epistemic virtue
- Epoché
- Equal consideration of interests
- Eroticism
- Essence
- Eternalism (philosophy of time)
- Eternity
- Ethics
- Ethics of care
- Eudaimonia
- Eupraxis
- Euthymia
- Evidence
- Evil
- Evil demon
- Existence
- Existential phenomenology
- Experience
- Experience machine
- Explanation
- Extensional and intensional definitions

== F ==
- Fact
- Fairness
- False
- Felicific calculus
- Fidelity
- Final anthropic principle
- Final cause
- Formal cause
- Formal theorem
- Form of the Good
- Four causes
- Freedom
- Free will
- Friendship
- Further facts

== G ==
- Gemeinschaft and Gesellschaft
- Gender
- Gettier problem
- God
- Good
- Grounding

== H ==
- Haecceity
- Half-truth
- Happiness
- Hard problem of consciousness
- Harmony
- Hate speech
- Henology
- Here is a hand
- Heteronomy
- Human nature
- Human rights
- Hypothetical imperative
- History

== I ==
- Idea
- Ideal
- Ideal speech situation
- Identity
- Ideological repression
- Ideology
- Ignoramus et ignorabimus
- Ignorance
- I know that I know nothing
- Immanence
- Immanent critique
- Implicate and explicate order
- Inductive reasoning
- Infallibility
- Inference
- Infinity
- Information
- Injustice
- Innocence
- Instantiation principle
- Institutional cruelty
- Instrumental and intrinsic value
- Intellectual responsibility
- Intention
- Integral philosophy
- Integral theory
- Integral yoga
- Interpellation
- Intrinsic and extrinsic properties
- Intuition
- Involution
- Irrationality
- Is–ought problem
- Ius indigenatus

== J ==
- Judgement
- Jus sanguinis
- Jus soli
- Just war
- Justice

== K ==
- Kathekon
- Kaula
- Kalachakra
- Kala
- Karma
- Karma yoga
- Khudi
- Kingdom of Ends
- KK thesis
- Knowledge
- Kundalini energy

Ma

== M ==
- Ma concept
- Magnificence
- Mansion of Many Apartments
- Mantra
- Marx's theory of alienation
- Marx's theory of human nature
- Master-slave dialectic
- Material cause
- Mathematical object
- Matter
- Max Scheler's Concept of Ressentiment
- Maya
- Meaning
- Meaning of life
- Memory
- Mental representation
- Mental state
- Mercy
- Metaphysics
- Mimesis
- Mind
- Mind–body problem
- Minority
- Modal logic
- Moksha
- Molyneux's Problem
- Morality
- Moral responsibility
- Motion
- Münchhausen trilemma
- Mundane reason

== N ==
- Name
- Nation
- Natural and legal rights
- Nature
- Necessary and sufficient condition
- Negative capability
- Nonmaleficence
- Norm of reciprocity
- Norm
- Normative science
- Normativity
- Nothing
- Notion
- Noumenon

== P ==
- Panopticon
- Paradox
- Passions
- Pattern
- Peace
- Percept
- Perception
- Peripatetic axiom
- Perpetual peace
- Personal identity
- Personhood
- Perspectival realism
- Phenomenal conservatism
- Phenomenon
- Philosophical analysis
- Philosophical razor
- Philosophical zombie
- Philosophy of futility
- Physical body
- Physis
- Pleasure
- Pneuma
- Politics
- Political consciousness
- Political freedom
- Polychotomous key
- Polyplocology
- Possible world
- Posthegemony
- Power
- Prakriti
- Purusha
- Pratyabhijna
- Praxis
- Presupposition
- Primum non nocere
- Principle
- Principle of double effect
- Private language argument
- Problem of induction
- Problem of mental causation
- Problem of other minds
- Prohairesis
- Property (ownership)
- Property (characteristic)
- Proposition
- Propositional attitude
- Propositional calculus

== Q ==
- Qualia
- Quality
- Quantity
- Quidditas

== R ==
- Rasa
- Rajas
- Raja yoga
- Rationality
- Real freedom
- Reason
- Reciprocity
- Reference
- Referent
- Reform
- Regress argument
- Research ethics
- Resemblance (philosophy)
- Religion
- Ren
- Right to exist
- Righteousness
- Rights
- Ring of Gyges
- Rule of Rescue

== S ==
- Satchidananda
- Sattva
- Sahaja
- Samarasa
- Sapere aude
- Satori
- Schema
- Science
- Scientific law
- Scientific method
- Self
- Self-realization
- Semantics
- Sense data
- Set
- Shabda
- Shakti
- Sunyata
- Slippery slope
- Simulacrum
- Simulated reality
- Simulation hypothesis
- Sittlichkeit
- Social construct
- Social contract
- Social equality
- Society
- Soku hi
- Sortal
- Soul
- Sovereignty
- Speculative reason
- State
- State of nature
- Style
- Sub specie aeternitatis
- Subject
- Subjunctive possibility
- Sublime
- Substance theory
- Substantial form
- Substitution
- Suffering
- Supererogation
- Supermind
- Superrationality
- Supertask
- Supervenience
- Symbol
- Syntax

== T ==
- Taste
- Tantra
- Teleology
- Teleology in biology
- Teletransportation paradox
- Telos
- Testimony
- The Golden Rule
- The saying and the said
- Theodicy
- Theorem
- Theory
- Theory of justification
- Thing-in-itself
- Thought
- Thought experiment
- Thrownness
- Thumos
- Tamas
- Ti
- Time
- Trailokya (Triloka)
- Traits theory
- Transcendent
- Transcendental apperception
- Transgenderism
- Transworld identity
- Trika
- Triratna
- Trilok (Jainism)
- Trust
- Truth
- Truth value
- Type

== U ==
- Übermensch
- Unity of science
- Unity of the proposition
- Universal
- Universality
- Unobservable
- Utilitarian rule
- Utility

== V ==
- Validity
- Value
- Vamachara
- Vajrayana
- Vertiginous question
- Vice
- Virtual
- Virtue
- Virtue ethics

== W ==
- Well-being
- Well-founded phenomenon
- Wisdom
- Work of art
- Wrong

== Y ==
- Yi
- Yoga
- Yidam

== Z ==
- Zeitgeist
