= Liberty =

State of freedom from constraint

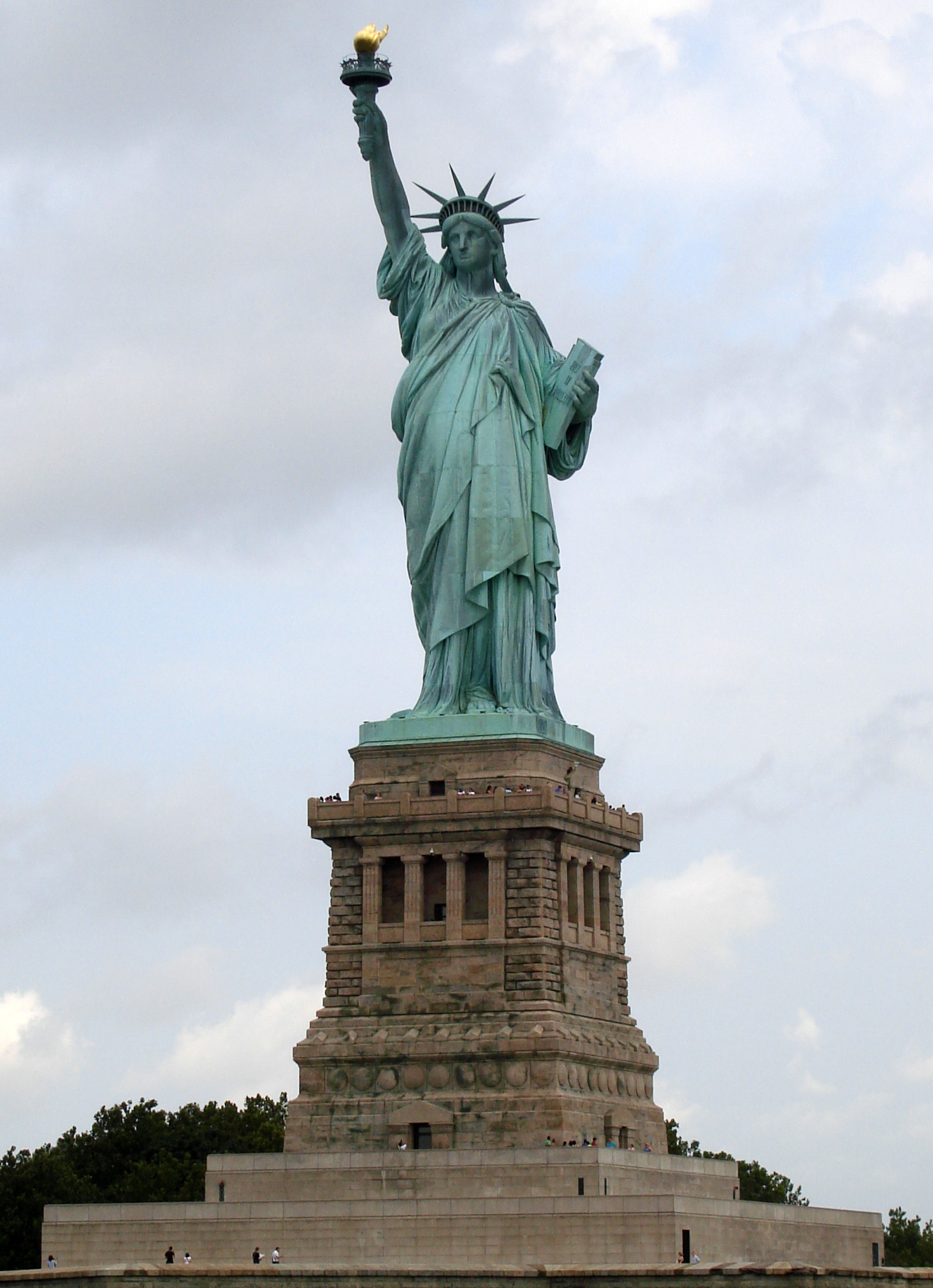
Liberty Enlightening the World (known as the Statue of Liberty), by sculptor Frédéric Auguste Bartholdi, was donated to the US by France in 1886 as an artistic personification of liberty.

Liberty is the state of being free within society from restrictions imposed by authority on one's way of life, behavior, or political views. The concept of liberty can vary depending on perspective and context. In the constitutional law of the United States, ordered liberty means creating a balanced society where individuals have the freedom to act without unnecessary interference (negative liberty) and access to opportunities and resources to pursue their goals (positive liberty), all within a fair legal system.

Sometimes liberty is differentiated from freedom by using the word "freedom" primarily, if not exclusively, to mean the ability to do as one wills and what one has the power to do; and using the word "liberty" to mean the absence of arbitrary restraints, taking into account the rights of all involved. In this sense, the exercise of liberty is subject to capability and limited by the rights of others. Thus liberty entails the responsible use of freedom under the rule of law without depriving anyone else of their freedom. Liberty can be taken away as a form of punishment. In many countries, people can be deprived of their liberty if they are convicted of criminal acts.

Liberty's etymology is from the Latin word liber, from Proto-Italic *louðeros, from Proto-Indo-European *h₁léwdʰeros, from *h₁lewdʰ- ('people') (thus cognate to archaic English lede meaning 'man, person'). The word "liberty" is commonly used in slogans or quotes, such as in "Life, Liberty and the pursuit of Happiness" from the United States Declaration of Independence, and France's national motto "Liberté, égalité, fraternité".

== Philosophy ==
Every man... is, of common right, and by the laws of God, a freeman, and entitled to the free enjoyment of liberty.

— Benjamin Franklin

Philosophers from the earliest times have considered the question of liberty. Roman Emperor Marcus Aurelius (121–180 AD) wrote:

a polity in which there is the same law for all, a polity administered with regard to equal rights and equal freedom of speech, and the idea of a kingly government which respects most of all the freedom of the governed.

According to compatibilist Thomas Hobbes (1588–1679):

a free man is he that in those things which by his strength and wit he is able to do is not hindered to do what he hath the will to do.

— Leviathan, Part 2, Ch. XXI.

John Locke (1632–1704) rejected that definition of liberty. While not specifically mentioning Hobbes, he attacks Sir Robert Filmer who had the same definition. According to Locke:

In the state of nature, liberty consists of being free from any superior power on Earth. People are not under the will or lawmaking authority of others but have only the law of nature for their rule. In political society, liberty consists of being under no other lawmaking power except that established by consent in the commonwealth. People are free from the dominion of any will or legal restraint apart from that enacted by their own constituted lawmaking power according to the trust put in it. Thus, freedom is not as Sir Robert Filmer defines it: 'A liberty for everyone to do what he likes, to live as he pleases, and not to be tied by any laws.' Freedom is constrained by laws in both the state of nature and political society. Freedom of nature is to be under no other restraint but the law of nature. Freedom of people under government is to be under no restraint apart from standing rules to live by that are common to everyone in the society and made by the lawmaking power established in it. Persons have a right or liberty to (1) follow their own will in all things that the law has not prohibited and (2) not be subject to the inconstant, uncertain, unknown, and arbitrary wills of others.

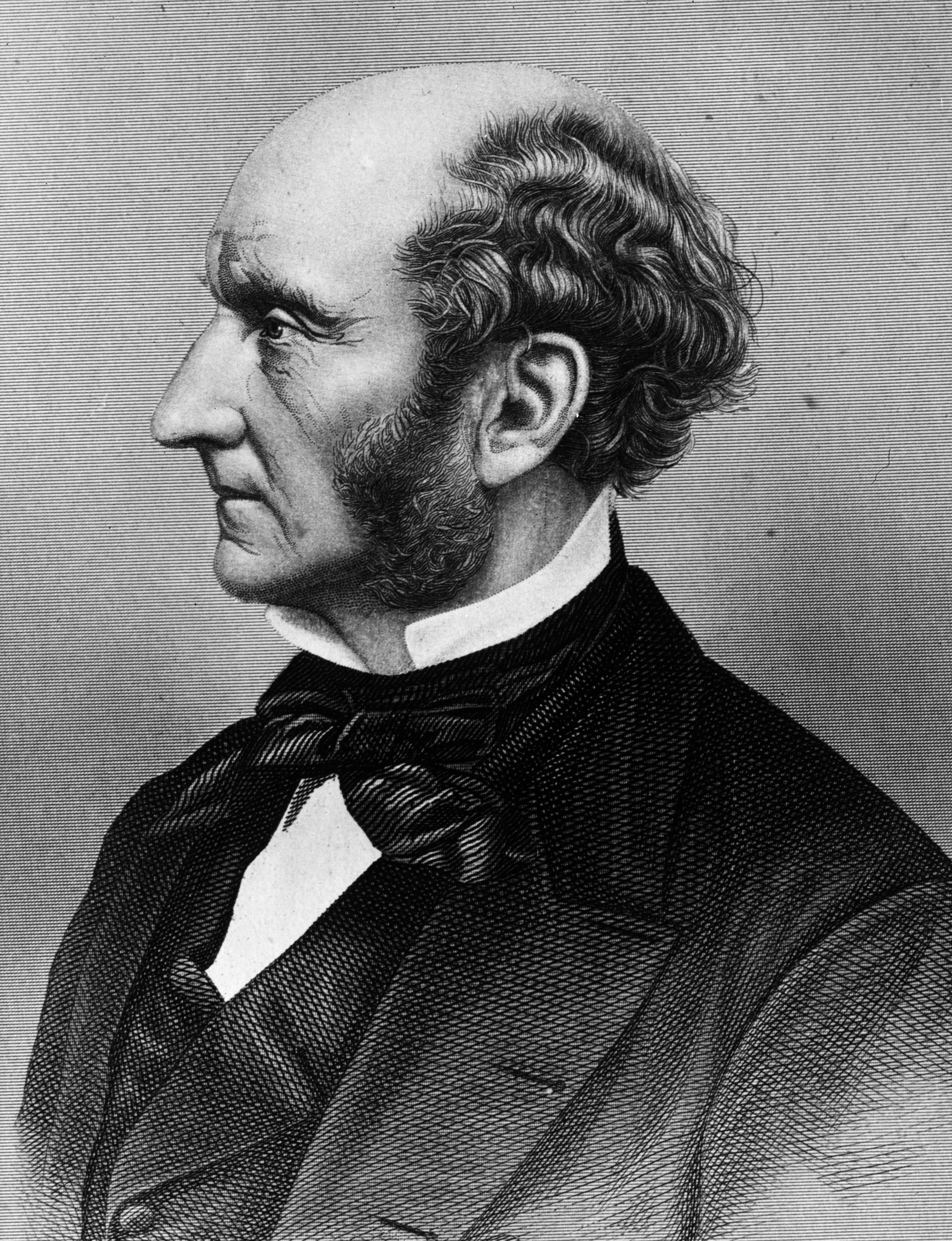
John Stuart Mill

John Stuart Mill, in his 1859 work On Liberty, was the first to recognize the difference between liberty as the freedom to act and liberty as the absence of coercion.

In his 1858 lecture "Two Concepts of Liberty", Isaiah Berlin formally framed the differences between two perspectives as the distinction between two opposite concepts of liberty: positive liberty and negative liberty. The latter designates a negative condition in which an individual is protected from tyranny and the arbitrary exercise of authority, while the former refers to the liberty that comes from self-mastery, the freedom from inner compulsions such as weakness and fear.

== Politics ==
=== History ===
Bust of Aristotle

The modern day concept of political liberty has its origins in the Greek concepts of freedom and slavery. To be free, to the Greeks, was not to have a master, to be independent from a master (to live as one likes). That was the original Greek concept of freedom. It is closely linked with the concept of democracy, as Aristotle put it:

"This, then, is one note of liberty which all democrats affirm to be the principle of their state. Another is that a man should live as he likes. This, they say, is the privilege of a freeman, since, on the other hand, not to live as a man likes is the mark of a slave. This is the second characteristic of democracy, whence has arisen the claim of men to be ruled by none, if possible, or, if this is impossible, to rule and be ruled in turns; and so it contributes to the freedom based upon equality."

This applied only to free men. In Athens, for instance, women could not vote or hold office and were legally and socially dependent on a male relative.

In the Maurya Empire of ancient India, citizens of all religions and ethnic groups had some rights to freedom, tolerance, and equality. The need for tolerance on an egalitarian basis can be found in the Edicts of Ashoka the Great, which emphasize the importance of tolerance in public policy by the government. The slaughter or capture of prisoners of war also appears to have been condemned by Ashoka. Slavery also appears to have been non-existent in the Maurya Empire. However, according to Hermann Kulke and Dietmar Rothermund, "Ashoka's orders seem to have been resisted right from the beginning."

Roman law also embraced certain limited forms of liberty, even under the rule of the Roman Emperors. However, these liberties were accorded only to Roman citizens. Many liberties established under Roman law endured through the Middle Ages, but were generally limited to the nobility and ruling classes, seldom extending to common people. The idea of inalienable and universal liberties had to wait until the Age of Enlightenment.

=== Social contract ===
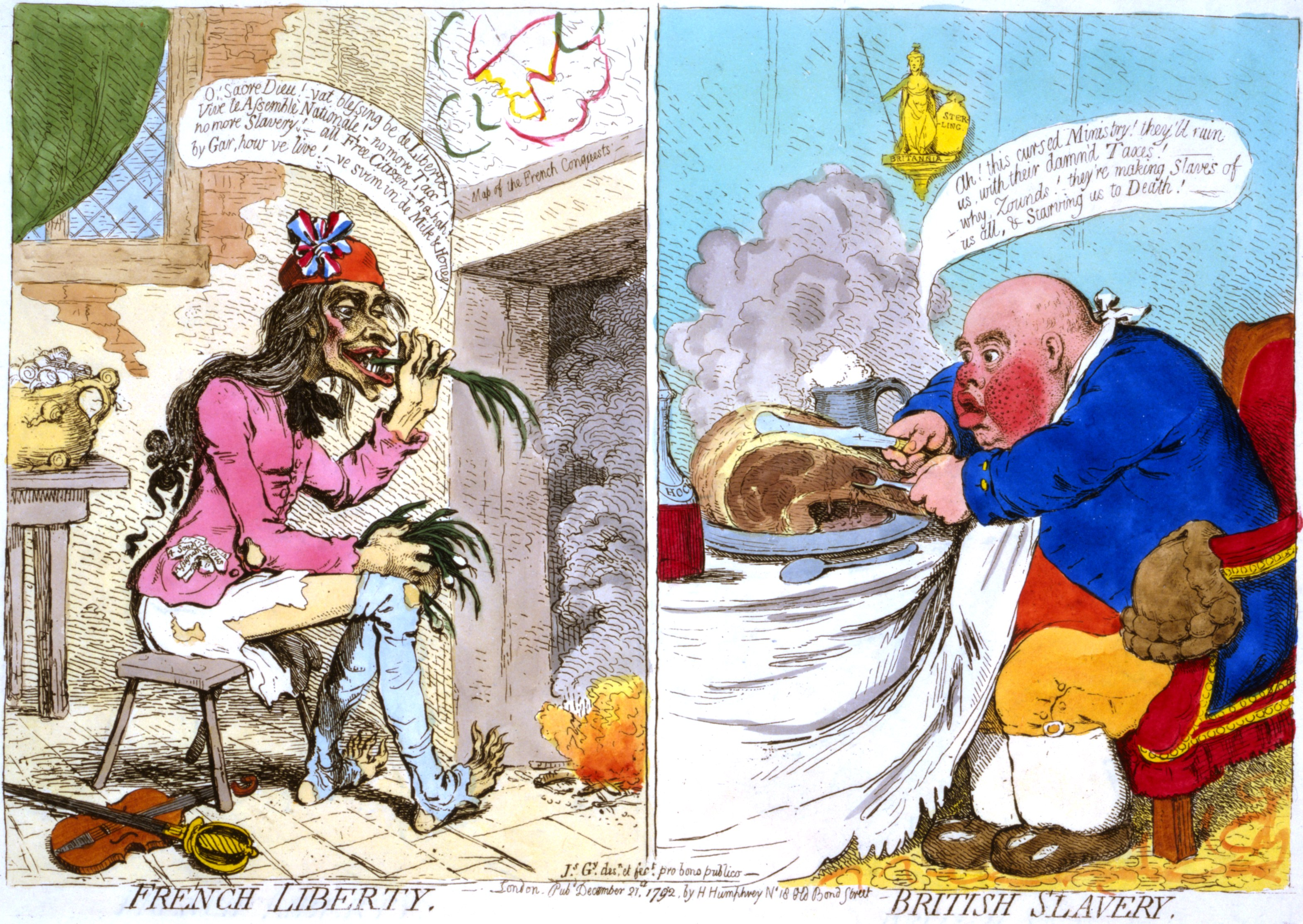
In French Liberty. British Slavery (1792), James Gillray caricatured French "liberty" as the opportunity to starve and British "slavery" as bloated complaints about taxation.

The social contract theory, most influentially formulated by Hobbes, John Locke and Rousseau (though first suggested by Plato in The Republic), was among the first to provide a political classification of rights, in particular through the notion of sovereignty and of natural rights. The thinkers of the Enlightenment reasoned that law governed both heavenly and human affairs, and that law gave the king his power, rather than the king's power giving force to law. This conception of law would find its culmination in the ideas of Montesquieu. The conception of law as a relationship between individuals, rather than families, came to the fore, and with it the increasing focus on individual liberty as a fundamental reality, given by "Nature and Nature's God," which, in the ideal state, would be as universal as possible.

In On Liberty, John Stuart Mill sought to define the "...nature and limits of the power which can be legitimately exercised by society over the individual," and as such, he describes an inherent and continuous antagonism between liberty and authority and thus, the prevailing question becomes "how to make the fitting adjustment between individual independence and social control".

== Origins of political freedom ==
According to a 2024 study, a global conception of liberty took form during the late Middle Ages (circa 1000–1600), as "emic terms used across Afro-Eurasia to denote liberty were interconnected through various translingual practices resulting from multilingual governance, courtly encounters, and the spread of religions. Words for liberty in different languages paralleled each other in bilingual legal documents, resonated with each other in different translations of religious texts, and stood next to each other in bureaucratic glossaries and dictionaries." The study concludes, "thus, the concept(s) of liberty, instead of being a product of the West, is more accurately seen as a result of interactions among different parts of the world; the globalization of liberty did not start with the global expansion of the Euro-American empires but has a rich and complex history that predates them."

=== England and Great Britain ===
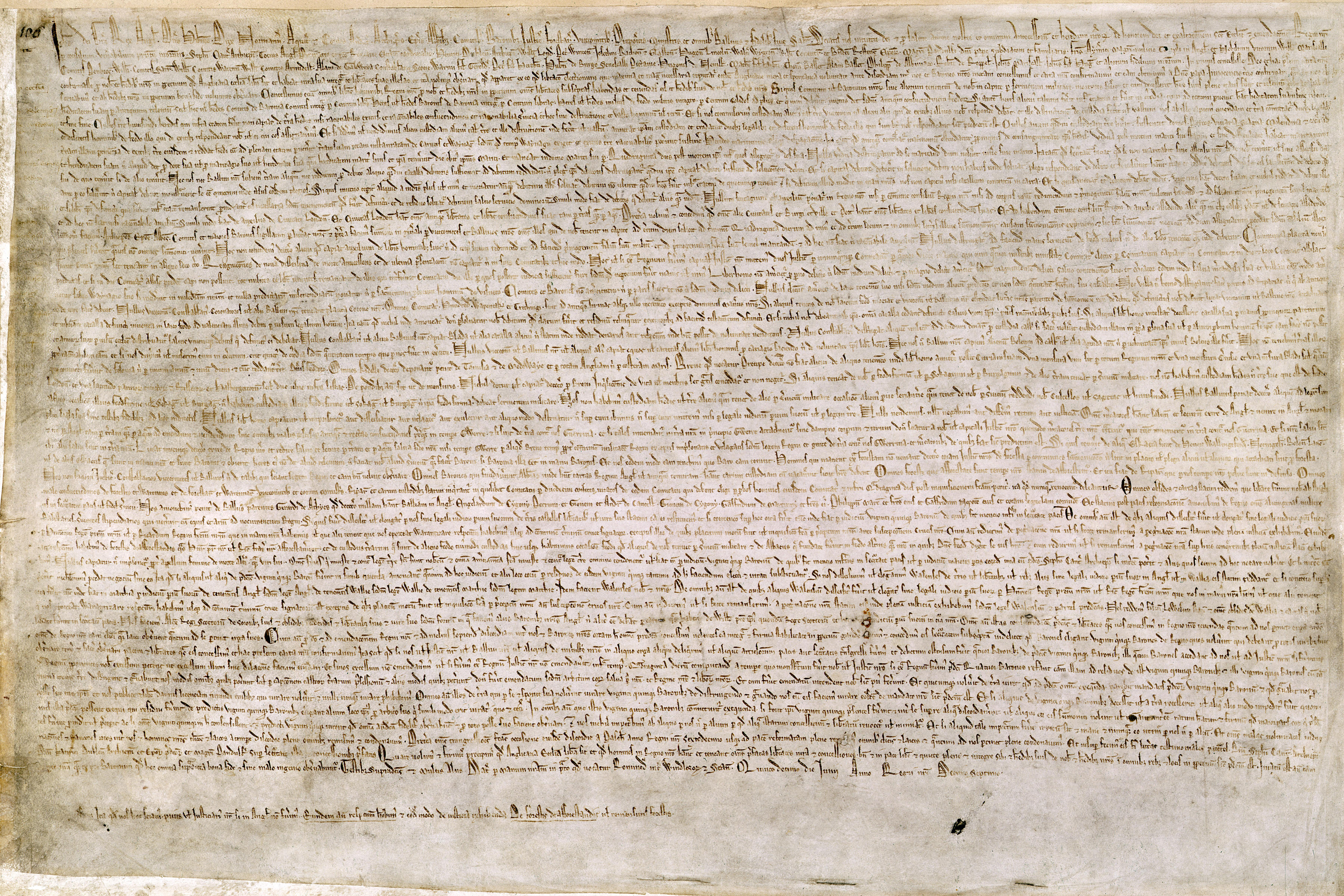
Magna Carta (originally known as the Charter of Liberties) of 1215. The British Library.

Timeline:

- 1066 – as a condition of his coronation William the Conqueror assented to the London Charter of Liberties which guaranteed the "Saxon" liberties of the City of London.
- 1100 – the Charter of Liberties is passed which sets out certain liberties of nobles, church officials and individuals.
- 1166 – Henry II of England transformed English law by passing the Assize of Clarendon. The act, a forerunner to trial by jury, started the abolition of trial by combat and trial by ordeal.
- 1187-1189 – publication of Tractatus de legibus et consuetudinibus regni Anglie which contains authoritative definitions of freedom and servitude.
- 1215 – Magna Carta was enacted, becoming the cornerstone of liberty in England, then Great Britain, and later the world.
- 1628 – the English Parliament passed the Petition of Right which set out specific liberties of English citizens.
- 1679 – the English Parliament passed the Habeas Corpus Act which outlawed unlawful or arbitrary imprisonment.
- 1689 – the Bill of Rights granted "freedom of speech in Parliament", and reinforced existing civil rights in England. The Scots law equivalent the Claim of Right is passed.
- 1772 – the Somerset v Stewart judgement found that slavery was unsupported by common law in England and Wales.
- 1859 – an essay by philosopher John Stuart Mill, entitled On Liberty, argued for toleration and individuality. "If any opinion is compelled to silence, that opinion may, for aught we can certainly know, be true. To deny this is to assume our own infallibility."
- 1948 – British representatives attempted to but were prevented from adding a legal framework to the Universal Declaration of Human Rights. It was not until 1976 that the International Covenant on Civil and Political Rights came into force, giving a legal status to most of the Declaration.
- 1958 – Two Concepts of Liberty, by Isaiah Berlin, identified "negative liberty" as an obstacle, as distinct from "positive liberty" which promotes self-mastery and the concepts of freedom.

=== United States ===
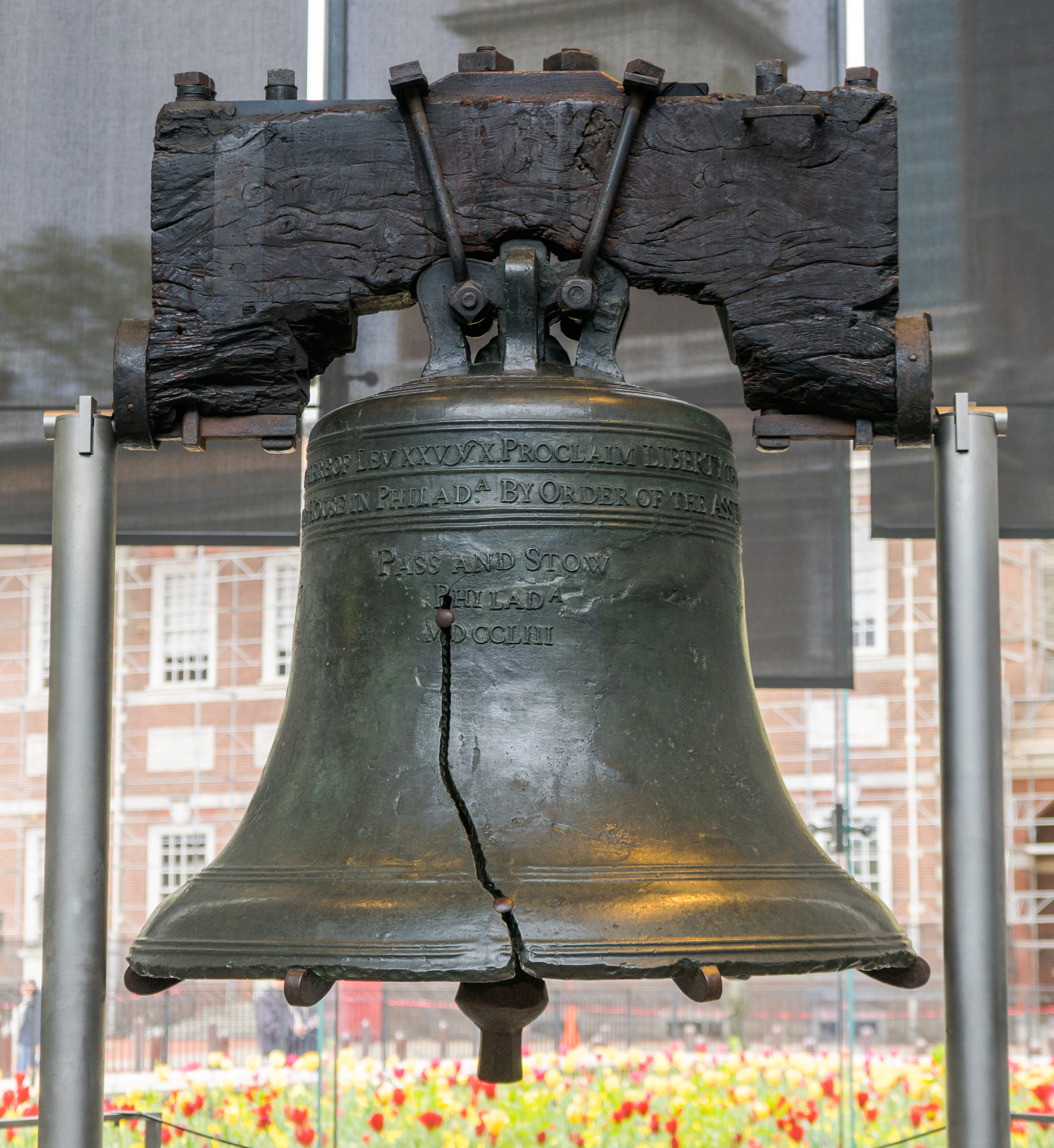
The Liberty Bell is a popular icon of liberty in the US.

According to the 1776 United States Declaration of Independence, all people have a natural right to "Life, Liberty and the pursuit of Happiness". This declaration of liberty was troubled for 90 years by the continued institutionalization of legalized Black slavery, as slave owners argued that their liberty was paramount since it involved property, their slaves, and that Blacks had no rights that any White man was obliged to recognize. The Supreme Court, in the 1857 Dred Scott decision, upheld this principle. In 1866, after the American Civil War, the US Constitution was amended to extend rights to persons of color, and in 1920 voting rights were extended to women.

By the later half of the 20th century, liberty was expanded further to prohibit government interference with personal choices. In the 1965 United States Supreme Court decision Griswold v. Connecticut, Justice William O. Douglas argued that liberties relating to personal relationships, such as marriage, have a unique primacy of place in the hierarchy of freedoms. Jacob M. Appel has summarized this principle:

I am grateful that I have rights in the proverbial public square – but, as a practical matter, my most cherished rights are those that I possess in my bedroom and hospital room and death chamber. Most people are far more concerned that they can control their own bodies than they are about petitioning Congress.

In modern America, various competing ideologies have divergent views about how best to promote liberty. Liberals in the original sense of the word see equality as a necessary component of freedom. Progressives stress freedom from business monopoly as essential. Libertarians disagree, and see economic and individual freedom as best. The Tea Party movement sees "big government" as an enemy of freedom. Other major participants in the modern American libertarian movement include the Libertarian Party, the Free State Project, and the Mises Institute.

=== France ===
Eugène Delacroix – Liberty Leading the People (La Liberté guidant le peuple) (1830)

France supported the Americans in their revolt against English rule and, in 1789, overthrew their own monarchy, with the cry of "Liberté, égalité, fraternité". The bloodbath that followed, known as the Reign of Terror, soured many people on the idea of liberty. Edmund Burke, considered one of the fathers of conservatism, wrote "The French had shewn themselves the ablest architects of ruin that had hitherto existed in the world."

== Ideologies ==
=== Liberalism ===
According to the Concise Oxford Dictionary of Politics, liberalism is "the belief that it is the aim of politics to preserve individual rights and to maximize freedom of choice". But they point out that there is considerable discussion about how to achieve those goals. Every discussion of freedom depends on three key components: who is free, what they are free to do, and what forces restrict their freedom. John Gray argues that the core belief of liberalism is toleration. Liberals allow others freedom to do what they want, in exchange for having the same freedom in return. This idea of freedom is personal rather than political. William Safire points out that liberalism is attacked by both the Right and the Left: by the Right for defending such practices as abortion, homosexuality, and atheism, and by the Left for defending free enterprise and the rights of the individual over the collective.

=== Libertarianism ===
According to the Encyclopædia Britannica, libertarians hold liberty as their primary political value. Their approach to implementing liberty involves opposing any governmental coercion, aside from that which is necessary to prevent individuals from coercing each other.

Libertarianism is guided by the principle commonly known as the Non-Aggression Principle (NAP). The Non-Aggression Principle asserts that aggression against an individual or an individual's property is always an immoral violation of one's life, liberty, and property rights. Utilizing deceit instead of consent to achieve ends is also a violation of the Non-Aggression principle. Therefore, under the framework of the Non-Aggression principle, rape, murder, deception, involuntary taxation, government regulation, and other behaviors that initiate aggression against otherwise peaceful individuals are considered violations of this principle. This principle is most commonly adhered to by libertarians. A common elevator pitch for this principle is, "Good ideas don't require force."

=== Republican liberty ===
According to republican theorists of freedom, like the historian Quentin Skinner or the philosopher Philip Pettit, republican liberty consists not simply in the absence of interference (negative liberal freedom), but in the absence of arbitrary dependence on others (as non-domination). A citizen is free when they are not subject to the discretionary will of any other party, public or private. According to this view, which originates in the Roman Digest, to be a free man, means not being subject to another's arbitrary will, that is to say, dominated by another. They cite Machiavelli who asserted that you must be a member of a free self-governing civil association, a republic, if you are to enjoy individual liberty.

While republican ideas of liberty influenced parliamentarians during the English Civil War, Thomas Hobbes developed a distinct conception of liberty in Leviathan, that emphasizes freedom as non-interference, partly in response to the political instability, rather than as a direct continuation of republican non-domination.

=== Socialism ===
Socialists view freedom as a concrete situation as opposed to a purely abstract ideal. Freedom is a state of being where individuals have agency to pursue their creative interests unhindered by coercive social relationships, specifically those they are forced to engage in as a requisite for survival under a given social system. Freedom thus requires both the material economic conditions that make freedom possible alongside social relationships and institutions conducive to freedom.

The socialist conception of freedom is closely related to the socialist view of creativity and individuality. Influenced by Karl Marx's concept of alienated labor, socialists understand freedom to be the ability for an individual to engage in creative work in the absence of alienation, where "alienated labor" refers to work people are forced to perform and un-alienated work refers to individuals pursuing their own creative interests.

==== Marxism ====
For Karl Marx, meaningful freedom is only attainable in a communist society characterized by superabundance and free access. Such a social arrangement would eliminate the need for alienated labor and enable individuals to pursue their own creative interests, leaving them to develop and maximize their full potentialities. This goes alongside Marx's emphasis on the ability of socialism and communism progressively reducing the average length of the workday to expand the "realm of freedom", or discretionary free time, for each person. Marx's notion of communist society and human freedom is thus radically individualistic.

=== Anarchism ===
While many anarchists see freedom slightly differently, all oppose authority, including the authority of the state, of capitalism, and of nationalism. For the Russian revolutionary anarchist Mikhail Bakunin, liberty did not mean an abstract ideal but a concrete reality based on the equal liberty of others. In a positive sense, liberty consists of "the fullest development of all the faculties and powers of every human being, by education, by scientific training, and by material prosperity." Such a conception of liberty is "eminently social, because it can only be realized in society," not in isolation. In a negative sense, liberty is "the revolt of the individual against all divine, collective, and individual authority."

== Historical writings on liberty ==
- John Locke (1689). Two Treatises of Government: In the Former, the False Principles, and Foundation of Sir Robert Filmer, and His Followers, Are Detected and Overthrown. the Latter Is an Essay Concerning the True Original, Extent, and End of Civil Government. London: Awnsham Churchill.
- Frédéric Bastiat (1850). The Law. Paris: Guillaumin & Co.
- John Stuart Mill (1859). On Liberty. London: John W Parker and Son.
- James Fitzjames Stephen (1874). Liberty, Equality, Fraternity. London: Smith, Elder, & Co.

== See also ==
- Civil liberties
- Gratis versus libre
- Harm principle
- Intentional living
- List of freedom indices
- Real freedom
- Refusal of work
- Rule according to higher law

== Bibliography ==
- Breay, Claire (2010). Magna Carta: Manuscripts and Myths. London: The British Library. ISBN 978-0-7123-5833-0.
- Danziger, Danny; Gillingham, John (2004). 1215: The Year of Magna Carta. Hodder Paperbacks. ISBN 978-0-340-82475-7.
