= Escape from Freedom =

1941 book by Erich Fromm

- Cover of the first edition
- Author: Erich Fromm
- Language: English
- Subject: Social psychology
- Publisher: Farrar & Rinehart
- Publication date: 1941
- Publication place: United States
- Pages: 257
- ISBN: 0-7448-0014-5

Escape from Freedom is a book by psychoanalyst Erich Fromm, first published under that title in the United States by Farrar & Rinehart in 1941 and a year later as The Fear of Freedom in the UK by Routledge & Kegan Paul. It was translated into German and first published in 1952 under the title Die Angst vor der Freiheit (The Fear of Freedom).

In the book, Fromm explores humanity's shifting relationship with freedom, how individual freedom can cause fear, anxiety, and alienation, and how many people seek relief by relinquishing freedom. He describes how authoritarianism can be a mechanism of escape for such people, with special emphasis on the psychosocial conditions that enabled the rise of Nazism.

== Summary ==
=== Fromm's concept of freedom ===
Fromm distinguishes between "freedom from" (negative freedom) and "freedom to" (positive freedom). The former refers to emancipation from restrictions such as social conventions placed on individuals by other people or institutions. This is the kind of freedom typified by the existentialism of Sartre, and has often been fought for historically but, according to Fromm, on its own it can be a destructive force unless accompanied by a creative element – 'freedom to' – the use of freedom to employ the total integrated personality in creative acts. This, he argues, necessarily implies a true connectedness with others that goes beyond the superficial bonds of conventional social intercourse: "...in the spontaneous realization of the self, man unites himself anew with the world..."

In the process of becoming freed from authority, Fromm says we are often left with feelings of hopelessness (he likens this process to the individuation of infants in the normal course of child development) that will not abate until we use our 'freedom to' and develop some form of replacement of the old order. However, a common substitute for exercising "freedom to" or authenticity is to submit to an authoritarian system that replaces the old order with another of different external appearance but identical function for the individual: to eliminate uncertainty by prescribing what to think and how to act. Fromm characterizes this as a dialectic historical process whereby the original situation is the thesis and the emancipation from it the antithesis. The synthesis is only reached when something has replaced the original order and provided humans with a new security. Fromm does not indicate that the new system will necessarily be an improvement. In fact, Fromm indicates this will only break the never-ending cycle of negative freedom that society submits to.

=== Freedom in history ===
Freedom, argues Fromm, became an important issue in the 20th century, being seen as something to be fought for and defended. However, it has not always occupied such a prominent place in people's thinking and, as an experience, is not necessarily something that is unambiguously enjoyable.

A major chapter in the book deals with the development of Protestant theology, with a discussion of the work of Calvin and Luther. The collapse of an old social order and the rise of capital led to a more developed awareness that people could be separate autonomous beings and direct their own future rather than simply fulfilling a socioeconomic role. This, in turn, fed into a new conception of God that had to account for the new freedom while still providing some moral authority. Luther painted a picture of man's relationship with God that was personal and individuated and free from the influence of the church, while Calvin's doctrine of predestination suggested that people could not work for salvation but have instead been chosen arbitrarily before they could make any difference. Both of these, argues Fromm, are responses to a freer economic situation. The first gives individuals more freedom to find holiness in the world around them without a complex church structure. The second, although superficially giving the appearance of a kind of determinism actually provided a way for people to work towards salvation. While people could not change their destinies, they could discover the extent of their holiness by committing themselves to hard work and frugality, both traits that were considered virtuous. In reality, this made people work harder to 'prove' to themselves that they were destined for God's kingdom.

=== Escaping freedom ===
As 'freedom from' is not an experience we enjoy in itself, Fromm suggests that many people, rather than using it successfully, attempt to minimise its negative effects by developing thoughts and behaviours that provide some form of security. These are as follows:

1. Authoritarianism: Fromm characterises the authoritarian personality as containing both sadistic and masochistic elements. The authoritarian wishes to gain control over other people in a bid to impose some kind of order on the world, but also wishes to submit to the control of some superior force which may come in the guise of a person or an abstract idea.
2. Destructiveness: Although this bears a similarity to sadism, Fromm argues that the sadist wishes to gain control over something. A destructive personality wishes to destroy something it cannot bring under its control.
3. Conformity: This process is seen when people unconsciously incorporate the normative beliefs and thought processes of their society and experience them as their own. This allows them to avoid genuine free thinking, which is likely to provoke anxiety.

=== Freedom in the 20th century ===
Fromm analyzes the character of Nazi ideology and suggests that the psychological conditions of Germany after the first world war fed into a desire for some form of new order to restore the nation's pride. This came in the form of Nazism and Fromm's interpretation of Mein Kampf suggests that Hitler had an authoritarian personality structure that not only made him want to rule over Germany in the name of a higher authority (the idea of a natural master race) but also made him an appealing prospect for an insecure middle class that needed some sense of pride and certainty. Fromm suggests there is a propensity to submit to authoritarian regimes when nations experience negative freedom but he sounds a positive note when he claims that the work of cultural evolution hitherto cannot be undone and Nazism does not provide a genuine union with the world.

Fromm examines democracy and freedom. Modern democracy and the industrialised nation are models he praises but it is stressed that the kind of external freedom provided by this kind of society can never be utilised to the full without an equivalent inner freedom. Fromm suggests that though we are free from the totalitarian influence of any sort in this kind of society, we are still dominated by the advice of experts and the influence of advertising. The way to become free as an individual is to be spontaneous in our self-expression and in the way we behave. This is crystallised in his existential statement "There is only one meaning of life: the act of living it". Fromm counters suggestions that this might lead to social chaos by claiming that being truly in touch with our humanity is to be truly in touch with the needs of those with whom we share the world.

== See also ==
- Two Concepts of Liberty
- Critical theory
- Freudo-Marxism
- Life Against Death
- The Paradox of Choice
- Psychohistory
