= Maeve Cooke =

Irish philosopher and academic

Academic background
- Education: University College Dublin (BA, MA), University of Konstanz (DPhil)
- Thesis: The claims of communication: Jürgen Habermas' programme of formal pragmatics, its contribution to the theory of meaning and its implications for a concept of communicative reason and rationality (1989)

Academic work
- Discipline: Philosophy
- Sub-discipline: Critical social theory

Maeve Cooke (born in 1959) is an Irish philosopher and a professor in the School of Philosophy at University College Dublin. Her research interests include political and social philosophy as well as philosophy of religion and philosophy of language. She is a proponent of contemporary critical social theory.

== Career ==
Cooke has a BA and MA from University College Dublin and a doctorate of philosophy from the University of Konstanz which she completed in 1989 with a thesis on formal pragmatics in Jürgen Habermas' theory of communication. She has held positions at various universities, in Ireland, the United States, and Germany, and was appointed as a Full Professor in the School of Philosophy at University College Dublin in 2006.

== Work ==
In her work, Cooke has variously focussed on notions of truth and the role of reasons in democratic discourse, freedom beyond conceptions of positive and negative liberty, secularism, anthropocentrism, and the future of critical theory.

Selected list of publications:

- Transformations in Critical Theory: Decentrings, Openings, Futures. Polity, 2026. ISBN 978-1-5095-7301-1
- "Five arguments for deliberative democracy." In: Democracy as Public Deliberation. Routledge, 2018: 53-87.
- "A secular state for a postsecular society? Postmetaphysical political theory and the place of religion." In: Constellations, Vol. 14(2), 2007: 224-238.
- Re-Presenting the Good Society. MIT Press, 2006. ISBN 978-0-262-27077-9
- "Authenticity and autonomy: Taylor, Habermas, and the politics of recognition." In: Political Theory, Vol. 25(2), 1997: 258-288.
- Language and Reason: A Study of Habermas's Pragmatics. MIT Press, 1997. ISBN 978-0-262-53145-0

== Awards ==
Cooke was elected as a member of the Royal Irish Academy in 2005. She has also received several research awards and fellowships including the Fulbright Irish Scholar Award in 2011 and the Humboldt Research Award in 2025.
