= Eupraxia =

Eupraxia may refer to:

- Eupraxia (mythology)
- Eupraxis, the art of performing a function correctly
- Eupraxia or Euphrasia of Constantinople
- Eupraxia of Kiev, Holy Roman Empress.
- Eupraxia of Ryazan, Princess consort of Ryazan by marriage
- Eupraxia, a European project aimed to build advanced particle accelerator research infrastructure

== See also ==
- Praxis (disambiguation)
- Dyspraxia
