= Ethical living =

Ethical living is the philosophy of making decisions for daily life which take into account ethics and moral values, particularly with regard to consumerism, sustainability, environmentalism, wildlife, and animal welfare.

== Practice and implementation ==
At present, it is largely an individual choice rather than an organized social movement. Ethical living is an offshoot of sustainable living in which the individual initially makes a series of small lifestyle changes in order to limit their effect on the environment. Making the decision to start to live ethically can be as easy as beginning to recycle, switching off lights when leaving a room, buying local organic or fair trade produce, or eating less meat. Many people often go further by re-using/re-cycling waste water, using renewable resources in their homes such as solar panels or atmospheric water generators, or replacing driving with greener modes of transport such as biking.

Many, however, believe that even more drastic lifestyle changes need to be made in order to combat climate change. For example, the impending increase in our world's population will likely exacerbate resource scarcity and increase carbon emissions. For this reason, many believe that ethical living could mean taking control of one's reproductive health and "requires social solutions such as increasing women's empowerment in public and private life, and broadening the population movement beyond the family planning and reproductive health movements in order to raise its chances of success."

== National and international policies ==
As Maxwell T. Boykoff, an assistant professor in the Cooperative Institute for Research in Environmental Sciences Center for Science and Technology Policy Research at the University of Colorado, Boulder argues, "initiatives and plans that were formerly confined to the climate-controlled quarters of high-level policy briefing rooms and scientific conference halls are increasingly prevalent around the kitchen table, bar stool, front porch and corner shop" making ethical patterns of consumption influential on domestic and international policies. For example, there are many governments, such as The Netherlands, that strive to create a "climate neutral society" focused on "trend breaks in technology, policy instruments, industrial, transport and agricultural practices, residential designs, and societal behavior".

While there are many calculators and venues with which to measure overall national and state level "ecological footprints", measurements for individual and community footprints are more difficult to measure. For this reason, the impacts of individual ethical living choices or "green living" can be inconclusive. Some researchers question the amount of carbon footprint reduction that can be achieved through "pro-environmental" behavior as surveys have found that "no significant difference was found between the ecological footprints of the two groups – suggesting that individual pro-environmental attitudes and behavior do not always reduce the environmental impacts of consumption."

This phenomenon has led to a new proposition known as the "behavior-impact gap (BIG) problem" where researchers realize that there may not always be a proportional relationship between changing lifestyle habits and a decrease in one's carbon footprint.

== Critiques ==
Although ethical living is growing in popularity, many in the environmental movement believe that the responsibility of ethical practice should also be placed on "Big Business". They argue that while individuals can change their daily habits, the most significant changes can and should be made by large organizations and multinational corporations.

Many criticize this argument, however, as they claim large organizations and multinational corporations increase consumption and perpetuate neoliberal and capitalistic tendencies leading to a loss of focus on "liveable wages, affordable health care, decent education, breathable air, and clean water." Another criticism of the ethical living movement is many individual consumption changes need to be made, however, “it will take more than a well-intentioned review of individual shopping habits to address our present ecological crisis.”

While there are major countries trying to push for these international policies. There are also many other factors in international policies as well as personal persuasion for these types of changes like certain cultural or economical factors that could influence these policies on how ethical they are. The majority of these countries pushing for the national policies are first world countries and already have established global economies.

== Gallery ==
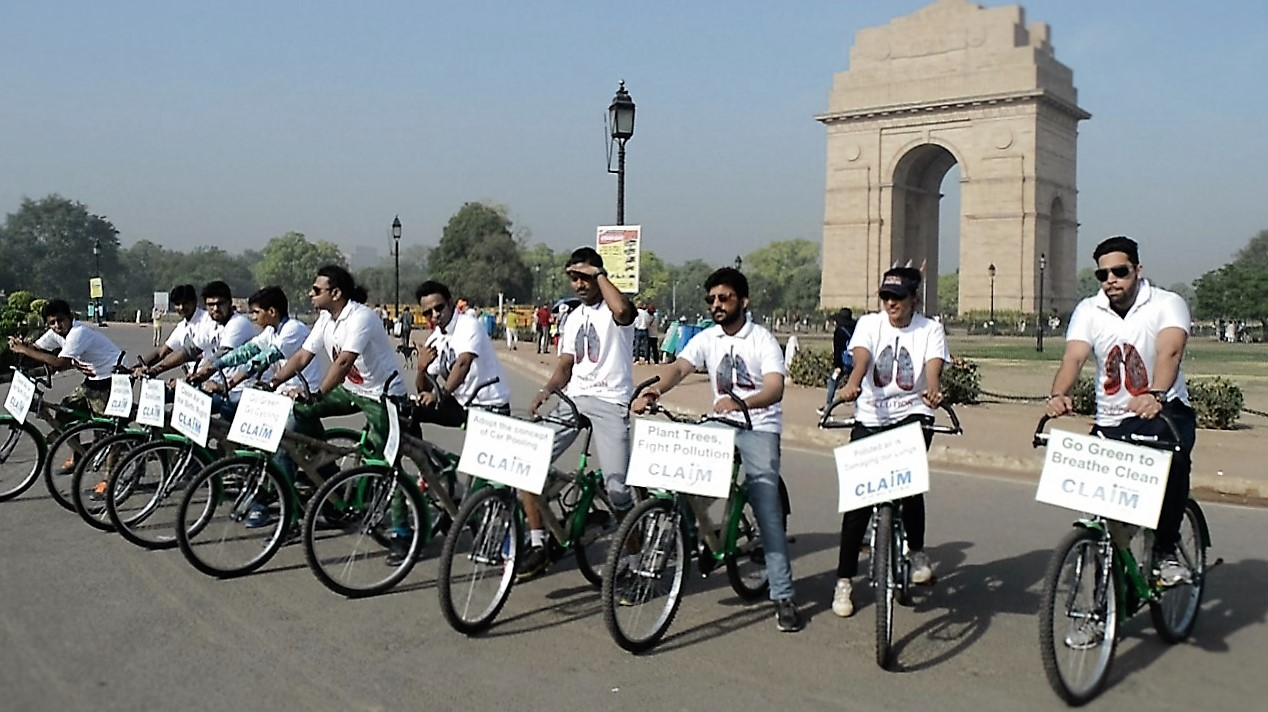

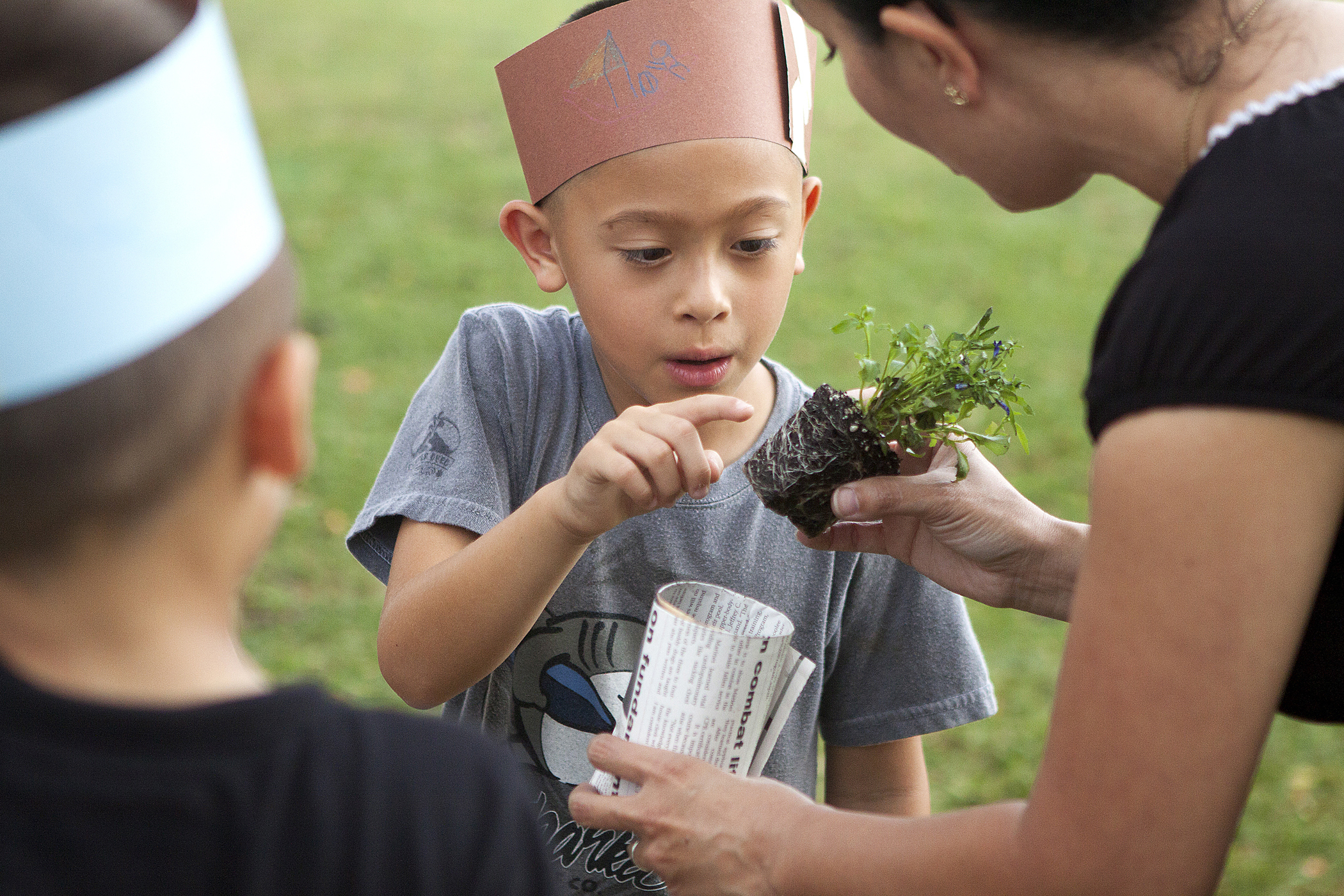

== See also ==
- Effective altruism
- Ethical consumerism
- Fairtrade labelling
- Simple living
- Sustainable living
- Intentional living
- Personal life
