= Emergence =

Unpredictable phenomenon in complex systems

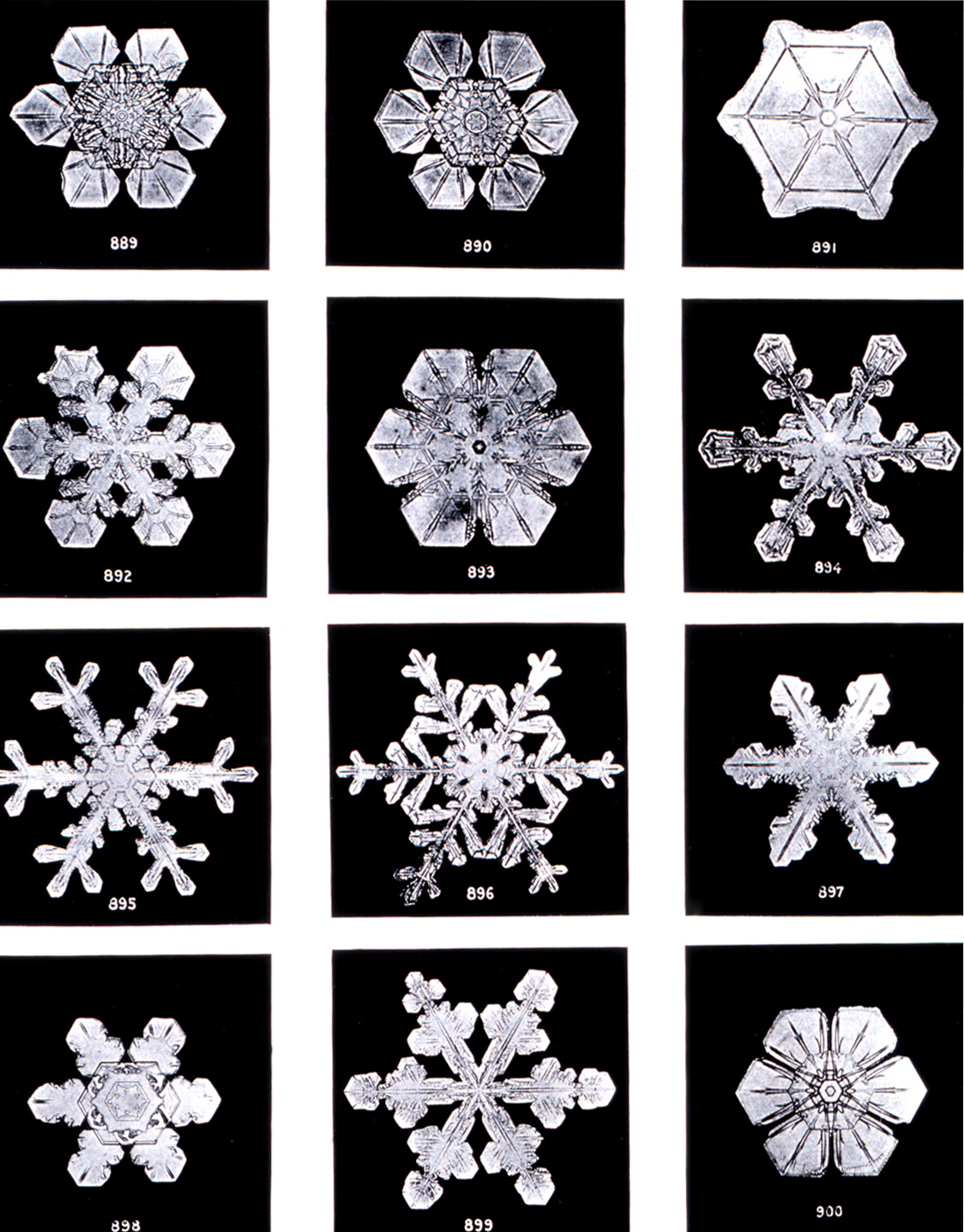
The formation of complex symmetrical and fractal patterns in snowflakes exemplifies emergence in a physical system.

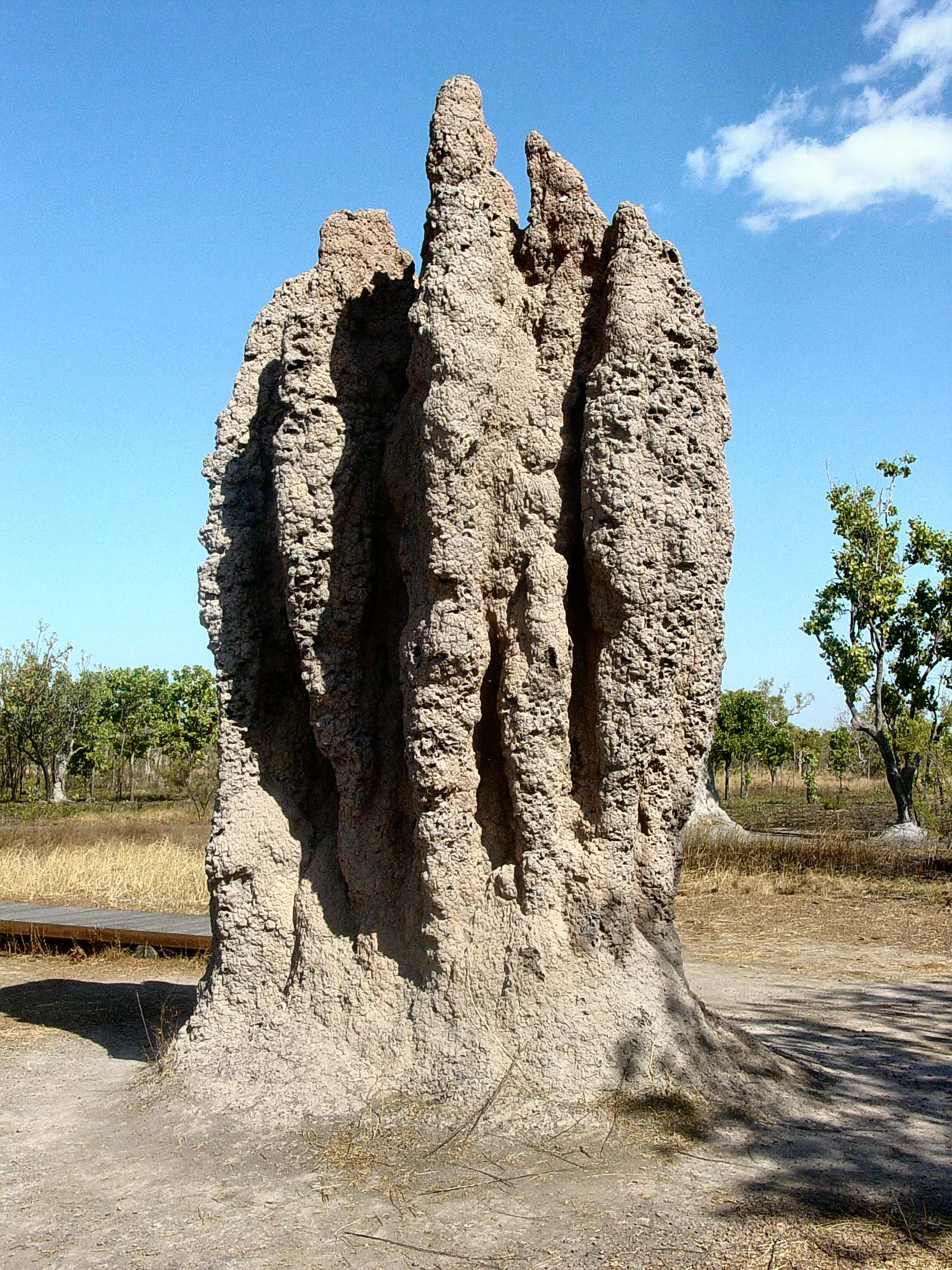
A termite "cathedral" mound produced by a termite colony offers a classic example of emergence in nature.

In philosophy, systems theory, science, and art, emergence occurs when a complex entity has properties or behaviors that its components do not have on their own, and emerge only when they interact in a wider whole.

Emergence plays a central role in theories of integrative levels and of complex systems. For instance, the phenomenon of life as studied in biology is arguably an emergent property of chemistry and physics.

== In philosophy ==
Philosophers often understand emergence as a claim about the etiology of a system's properties. An emergent property of a system, in this context, is one that is not a property of any component of that system, but is still a feature of the system as a whole. Emergent wholes are often described as "more than" or "different to" the sum of their parts.

=== History ===
This concept of emergence dates from at least the time of Aristotle. Since then, many scientists and philosophers have written on the concept.

==== Anglophone philosophy ====
The first philosophers to use the term "emergent" in its philosophical sense were the "British Emergentists", who characterised life as an emergent phenomenon. This tradition has been dated back to John Stuart Mill's Composition of Causes (1843). In 1875, G. H. Lewes distinguished "emergent" from merely "resultant" phenomena:

Every resultant is either a sum or a difference of the co-operant forces; their sum, when their directions are the same – their difference, when their directions are contrary. Further, every resultant is clearly traceable in its components, because these are homogeneous and commensurable. It is otherwise with emergents, when, instead of adding measurable motion to measurable motion, or things of one kind to other individuals of their kind, there is a co-operation of things of unlike kinds. The emergent is unlike its components insofar as these are incommensurable, and it cannot be reduced to their sum or their difference.

Other philosophers associated with "British Emergentism" include Samuel Alexander, C.D. Broad, and Julian Huxley.

==== Continental philosophy ====
Heidegger has been interpreted as referencing emergence with his notion of poiêsis. Derived from the Greek word poiein, meaning "to make", poiêsis refers to a bringing-forth that encompasses not just a process of crafting (techne) but also the broader sense of something coming into being or revealing itself. Heidegger used emerging blossoms and butterflies as examples to describe poiêsis as a threshold event where something moves from one state to another.

Nicolai Hartmann (1882–1950) termed emergence a categorial novum (new category).

==== Philosophy of mind ====
An ongoing debate in philosophy of mind concerns the question of whether mental states can be considered emergent properties of the brain. Some philosophers have argued that consciousness is an emergent phenomenon.

=== Variations ===
==== Weak and strong ====
Usage of the notion "emergence" is often subdivided into two perspectives: "weak emergence" and "strong emergence". Philosopher David Chalmers writes that emergence often causes confusion in philosophy and science due to a failure to demarcate weak and strong emergence, which are "quite different concepts".

Both "weak" and "strong" positions hold that emergent properties are dependent on lower-level phenomena while nevertheless being in some sense autonomous from them.

Weak emergence describes scenarios in which emergent properties, while unexpected, can be deduced from their constituent components. A property may be described as weakly emergent if it is the result of interaction rather than aggregation (for example, how the behaviour of an ant colony is produced by exchanges among individuals); if it is sufficient to explain and predict a system (for example, how the path of a tornado can be deduced without reference to its molecular components); or if it can be multiply realised by systems possessing different components (for example, how similar mental states can be produced by different brains). Philosopher Mark Bedau writes that in cases of weak emergence, the emergent property is amenable to computer simulation or similar forms of after-the-fact analysis (for example, the formation of a traffic jam, the structure of a flock of starlings in flight, or the formation of galaxies). Although new properties arise in systems as a result of the interactions at a fundamental level, the properties can be determined by observing or simulating the system as a whole, without requiring a reductionist analysis. At large enough scales, seemingly chaotic, hard-to-predict behaviour can emerge, while at a microscopic scale the behaviour of the constituent parts can be fully deterministic.

Strong emergence, by contrast, describes scenarios in which emergent properties cannot be deduced from their constituent components, even in principle. The emergent entity must have the following characteristics: it must be distinct from its constituents, it must be novel with respect to its constituents, and the existence of the emergent entity must be dependent on the existence of its constituents. Bedau argues that for strongly emergent properties no simulation of the system can exist, for such a simulation would itself constitute a reduction of the system to its constituent parts. Chalmers states that the only strongly emergent phenomenon is the hard problem of consciousness.

==== Subjective and objective ====
Weak and strong emergence are often described as compatible with "subjective" and "objective" accounts of emergence respectively (sometimes termed "epistemic" and "ontological" emergence). Subjective accounts maintain that emergence requires the impossibility in practice, rather than in principle, to explain the whole in terms of the parts. This position is defended by its advocates on the grounds that it does not imply the appearance of mysterious forces, but simply reflects the limits of individuals' capabilities. Physicist James Crutchfield regards the properties of complexity and organization of any system as subjective qualities determined by the observer:

Defining structure and detecting the emergence of complexity in nature are inherently subjective, though essential, scientific activities. Despite the difficulties, these problems can be analysed in terms of how model-building observers infer from measurements the computational capabilities embedded in non-linear processes. An observer's notion of what is ordered, what is random, and what is complex in its environment depends directly on its computational resources: the amount of raw measurement data, of memory, and of time available for estimation and inference. The discovery of structure in an environment depends more critically and subtly, though, on how those resources are organized. The descriptive power of the observer's chosen (or implicit) computational model class, for example, can be an overwhelming determinant in finding regularity in data.

An observer who could see the precise micro-scale dynamics of every system - such as Laplace's Demon - would not see properties as emergent, as it would understand the exact dynamics giving rise to them. Cognitively limited beings like humans, however, must rely on "coarse-grained" descriptions of the world, and these descriptions can be both predictive and explanatory.

Subjective accounts of emergence are closely related to probability as described in statistical mechanics and Information theory, in which the emergent tendency of entropy to increase over time is a reflection of observers' ignorance of the total system.

==== Macro-level and micro-level relations ====
Sean Carroll and Achyuth Parola propose a taxonomy that classifies emergent phenomena by how the macro-description relates to the underlying micro-dynamics.

- Type‑0 (Featureless) Emergence: A coarse-graining map Φ from a micro state space A to a macro state space B that commutes with time evolution, without requiring any further decomposition into subsystems.
- Type‑1 (Local) Emergence: Emergence where the macro theory is defined in terms of localized collections of micro-subsystems. This category is subdivided into:
  - Type‑1a (Direct) Emergence: When the emergence map Φ is algorithmically simple (i.e. compressible), so that the macro behavior is easily deduced from the micro-states.
  - Type‑1b (Incompressible) Emergence: When Φ is algorithmically complex (i.e. incompressible), making the macro behavior appear more novel despite being determined by the micro-dynamics.
- Type‑2 (Nonlocal) Emergence: Cases in which both the micro and macro theories admit subsystem decompositions, yet the macro entities are defined nonlocally with respect to the micro-structure, meaning that macro behavior depends on widely distributed micro information.
- Type‑3 (Augmented) Emergence: A form of strong emergence in which the macro theory introduces additional ontological variables that do not supervene on the micro-states, thereby positing genuinely novel macro-level entities.

=== Criticisms ===
==== Violation of physicalism ====
Some thinkers propose that emergence contravenes physicalism, and thus common understandings of physics. Mark Bedau observes:

Although strong emergence is logically possible, it is uncomfortably like magic. How does an irreducible but supervenient downward causal power arise, since by definition it cannot be due to the aggregation of the micro-level potentialities? Such causal powers would be quite unlike anything within our scientific ken. This not only indicates how they will discomfort reasonable forms of materialism. Their mysteriousness will only heighten the traditional worry that emergence entails illegitimately getting something from nothing.

The concern that strong emergence does so entail is that such a consequence must be incompatible with metaphysical principles such as the principle of sufficient reason or the Latin dictum ex nihilo nihil fit, often translated as "nothing comes from nothing". For physicalists, the principle of sufficient reason generally implies the causal closure of the physical realm. Strong emergentism seems to violate causal closure by introducing novel causal entities that cannot be accounted for at the microscale. Emergentists may respond to this challenge by embracing a weaker form of emergentism, rejecting physicalism (see substance dualism), or rejecting physical causal closure. Indeed, some thinkers claim that the phenomenon of emergence itself provides evidence against physical causal closure, pointing out that there is precedent in physics for embracing unintuitive conclusions when empirically required.

==== Overdetermination ====
Emergence has been criticized for leading to causal overdetermination. The canonical example concerns emergent mental states (M and M∗) that supervene on physical states (P and P∗) respectively. Let M and M∗ be emergent properties. Let M∗ supervene on base property P∗. What happens when M causes M∗? Jaegwon Kim says:

In our schematic example above, we concluded that M causes M∗ by causing P∗. So M causes P∗. Now, M, as an emergent, must itself have an emergence base property, say P. Now we face a critical question: if an emergent, M, emerges from basal condition P, why cannot P displace M as a cause of any putative effect of M? Why cannot P do all the work in explaining why any alleged effect of M occurred? If causation is understood as nomological (law-based) sufficiency, P, as M's emergence base, is nomologically sufficient for it, and M, as P∗'s cause, is nomologically sufficient for P∗. It follows that P is nomologically sufficient for P∗ and hence qualifies as its cause...If M is somehow retained as a cause, we are faced with the highly implausible consequence that every case of downward causation involves overdetermination (since P remains a cause of P∗ as well). Moreover, this goes against the spirit of emergentism in any case: emergents are supposed to make distinctive and novel causal contributions.

If M is the cause of M∗, then M∗ is overdetermined because M∗ can also be thought of as being determined by P. The possibility that emergent phenomena may simply be determined by their base properties is known as the problem of "collapse".

One way in which a defender of emergence could respond to the problem of collapse would be to reject downward causation, and so reject strong emergence. Alternately, a defender of strong emergence may reject physical causal closure, and so the account of causation on which Kim's argument rests. Philosopher Carl Gillet has responded to the problem of overdetermination by proposing that emergence is better understood as the introduction of novel causal powers of components of wholes, rather than the wholes themselves.

== In science ==
=== Physics ===
In physics, the idea of emergence has been used to describe properties, laws, or phenomena which occur at macroscopic but not microscopic scales. In statistical mechanics, for instance, entropy can be regarded as an emergent phenomenon, insofar as the maximum entropy of a system reflects the most probable state of the system as a whole. The laws of thermodynamics state that we can predict the macroscopic thermodynamic properties of a system even if we do not know the precise behaviour of its parts. To use emergence in this sense, physicists need only accept a 'weak' view (see above), according to which it is maintained that if an observer did possess complete knowledge of the microscopic states of a system, they would be able to precisely calculate its macroscopic properties.

Some physicists have, however, attempted to empirically justify a 'strong' view of emergence. Renormalization methods in theoretical physics enable physicists to study critical phenomena that are not tractable as the combination of their parts. In 2009, Gu et al. presented a class of infinite physical systems that exhibit non-computable macroscopic properties. The authors claimed that if one could compute certain macroscopic properties of these systems from the microscopic description of these systems, then one would be able to solve computational problems known to be undecidable in computer science. (These results concern infinite systems, finite systems being considered computable.) However, macroscopic concepts which only apply in the limit of infinite systems, such as phase transitions and the renormalization group, are important for understanding and modelling real, finite physical systems. Gu et al. concluded:

Although macroscopic concepts are essential for understanding our world, much of fundamental physics has been devoted to the search for a 'theory of everything', a set of equations that perfectly describe the behavior of all fundamental particles. The view that this is the goal of science rests in part on the rationale that such a theory would allow us to derive the behavior of all macroscopic concepts, at least in principle. The evidence we have presented suggests that this view may be overly optimistic. A 'theory of everything' is one of many components necessary for complete understanding of the universe, but is not necessarily the only one. The development of macroscopic laws from first principles may involve more than just systematic logic, and could require conjectures suggested by experiments, simulations or insight.

It has been suggested that emergence arises from the phenomenon of broken symmetry, in which systems undergo phase transitions such that the symmetry present in the microscopic equations is not present in the macroscopic system. This means that while the microscopic dynamics of the system may be reversible, the macroscopic properties evolve with respect to an arrow of time. Steven and Sophia Kivelson use this notion to propose that emergence in physics should be defined as follows:

An emergent behavior of a physical system is a qualitative property that can only occur in the limit that the number of microscopic constituents tends to infinity.

=== Chemistry and biology ===
It has been argued that sciences other than physics, such as chemistry, biology and the social sciences, owe their autonomy to the fact that the phenomena they study are emergent. On a 'weak' account of emergence, this is because the explanations, descriptions and models offered in these sciences may be accurate as coarse-grained ways of understanding the world, even if they do not provide complete accounts of the microscale physical phenomena in question. It is therefore productive to treat entities such as cells, organisms, persons or nations as legitimate causal actors rather than simply clusters of fundamental forces.

For defenders of 'strong' emergence (see above), this is because it is in principle impossible to describe the phenomena that chemistry, biology and the social sciences study in terms of fundamental physical laws. Theoretical physicist Philip W. Anderson states:

The ability to reduce everything to simple fundamental laws does not imply the ability to start from those laws and reconstruct the universe. The constructionist hypothesis breaks down when confronted with the twin difficulties of scale and complexity. At each level of complexity entirely new properties appear. Psychology is not applied biology, nor is biology applied chemistry. We can now see that the whole becomes not merely more, but very different from the sum of its parts.

=== Social sciences ===
See also: Spontaneous order and Self-organization

Sociologist Max Weber, in The Protestant Ethic and the Spirit of Capitalism (1905), argued that human beings are the basic elements of social systems, which perpetually interact to create, maintain, or untangle mutual social bonds. The resulting social formations may be considered emergent.

Economists such as Karl Polyani have argued that, under capitalism, growth, accumulation and innovation can be considered emergent processes. Technological processes sustain growth, which then becomes the source of further innovations in a recursive, self-expanding feedback loop. The emergence of new structures and institutions connected to the multi-scale process of growth may prompt a shift from one kind of economic system to another - for example, one based on agriculture to one based on industry. Due to concerns regarding social and ecological limits, both degrowth and social ecological economics have argued in favor of economic transformations that overcome the dependence of human wellbeing on economic growth.

In linguistics, the concept of emergence has been applied in the domain of stylometry to explain the interrelation between the syntactical structures of the text and the author style. It has also been argued that the structure and regularity of language grammar, or at least language change, is an emergent phenomenon. While each speaker merely tries to reach their own communicative goals, they use language in a particular way. If enough speakers behave in that way, language is changed. In a wider sense, the norms of a language - i.e. the linguistic conventions of its speech society - can be seen as a system emerging from long-time participation in communicative problem-solving in various social circumstances.

== In organization development ==
Practitioners in group facilitation and organization development have designed a number of group processes that are designed to maximize emergence and self-organization in human organizations. Examples include SEED-SCALE, appreciative inquiry, Future Search, the world cafe or knowledge cafe, Open Space Technology and Theory U. SEED-SCALE, for instance, which has been used in international development contexts, attempts to induce socio-economic development fitted to local cultural values, community economics, and natural environments by implementing a sequence of standardized tasks that self-assemble in individually specific ways.

In the book Presence: Exploring Profound Change in People, Organizations and Society, Peter Senge and co-authors argue that living systems at all levels - be it a sentient body, a tree, a family, an organisation, the education system, the economy, the health system, or the political system - are continuously self-organising to produce unpredictable emergent outcomes. They write that "as long as our thinking is governed by habit - notably industrial, 'machine age' concepts such as control, predictability, standardization, and 'faster is better' - we will continue to recreate institutions as they have been, despite their disharmony with the larger world, and the need for all living systems to evolve".

Building on this, Nora Bateson and colleagues have explored the notion of inducing "readyness" for change in social organizations, which they argue involves nourishing flexibility. As explained in their paper An essay on ready-ing: Tending the prelude to change: "While linear managing or controlling of the direction of change may appear desirable, tending to how the system becomes ready allows for pathways of possibility previously unimagined." Their "Warm Data Labs" are designed to put these ideas into practice.

In Emergent Strategy, adrienne maree brown defines emergent strategies as "ways for humans to practice complexity and grow the future through relatively simple interactions".

== In technology ==
The bulk conductive response of binary (RC) electrical networks with random arrangements, known as the universal dielectric response (UDR), can be seen as emergent properties of such physical systems. Such arrangements can be used as simple physical prototypes for deriving mathematical formulae for the emergent responses of complex systems.

Internet traffic can also exhibit some seemingly emergent properties. In the congestion control mechanism, TCP flows can become globally synchronized at bottlenecks, simultaneously increasing and then decreasing throughput in coordination. Congestion, widely regarded as a nuisance, is possibly an emergent property of the spreading of bottlenecks across a network in high traffic flows which can be considered as a phase transition.

Some artificially intelligent (AI) computer applications simulate emergent behavior. One example is Boids, which mimics the swarming behavior of birds.

Some theorists have argued that technological artefacts (structures, devices, tools, and even works of art) consist of components with properties differing from the object itself, and that we can call these properties emergent because they did not exist at the component level. They are created for a specific purpose and are therefore subjectively or 'weakly' emergent (see above): someone who doesn't understand the purpose can't use it. The artefact is the result of an invention: through a clever combination of components, something new is created with emergent properties and functionalities. This invention is often difficult to predict and therefore usually based on a chance discovery. An invention based on discovery is often improved through a feedback loop, making it more applicable. This, it is argued, is an example of downward causation. For example, a hammer is a combination of a head and a handle, each with different properties. By cleverly connecting them, the hammer becomes an artifact with new, emergent functionalities. Through downward causation, you can improve the head and handle components in such a way that the hammer's functionality increases.

== In religion and art ==
Some theorists, such as Stuart Kauffman, Ursula Goodenough, and Terrence Deacon, have argued that the phenomenon of emergence can be used to support religious naturalism and syntheism. From this perspective, the sacred may be perceived in the workings of entirely naturalistic processes by which more complex forms arise or evolve from simpler forms. More recently, this notion has been explored in works such as Syntheism – Creating God in The Internet Age by Alexander Bard and Jan Söderqvist (2014) and Emergentism: A Religion of Complexity for the Metamodern World by Brendan Graham Dempsey (2022).

Michael J. Pearce has used emergence to describe the experience of works of art in relation to contemporary neuroscience.

Practicing artist Leonel Moura attributes to his "artbots" a real, if nonetheless rudimentary, creativity based on emergent principles.

Novelist Arthur Koestler used the metaphor of Janus (a symbol of the unity underlying seemingly opposed complements) to illustrate how the two perspectives of reductionism and emergence should be treated as non-exclusive.

== Notable philosophers and scientists ==
The concept of emergence has been significantly shaped and debated by numerous philosophers and scientists over the years.

Philosopher or scientist	Contribution	Major work
Aristotle	One of the earliest thinkers to suggest that the whole could possess properties that its individual parts did not. This idea laid the foundational groundwork by emphasizing that certain phenomena cannot be fully explained by their individual components alone.	Metaphysics
George Henry Lewes	Formally introduced the term "emergence" in the 19th century. He distinguished between "resultant" and "emergent" properties where emergent properties could not be predicted from the properties of the parts.	Problems of Life and Mind
John Stuart Mill	Early proponent of the concept of emergence in social and political contexts. Mill's work emphasized the importance of understanding social phenomena as more than the sum of individual actions.	A System of Logic
C. D. Broad	In his 1925 book The Mind and Its Place in Nature, Broad argued that mental states were emergent properties of brain processes. He developed a comprehensive philosophical framework for emergentism and advocated for the irreducibility of higher-level properties.	The Mind and Its Place in Nature
Samuel Alexander	In his work Space, Time, and Deity, Alexander suggested that emergent qualities like consciousness and life could not be fully explained by underlying physical processes alone.	Space, Time, and Deity
Jaegwon Kim	A prominent critic and commentator on emergence. Kim extensively analyzed the limits and scope of emergent properties, particularly in the context of mental causation and the philosophy of mind, questioning the coherence and causal efficacy of emergent properties.	Mind in a Physical World
Michael Polanyi	Advanced the idea that emergent properties are irreducible and possess their own causal powers. Polanyi's work in chemistry and philosophy of science provided empirical and theoretical support for emergentist concepts, especially in complex systems and hierarchical structures.	Personal Knowledge
Philip W. Anderson	Nobel laureate in physics, Anderson's work on condensed matter physics and the theory of superconductivity provided significant empirical examples of emergent phenomena. His famous essay, "More is Different," showed that as systems grow in scale and complexity, qualitatively new properties and principles emerge, requiring autonomous theories rather than simple extrapolations from particle-level laws.	More is Different
Stuart Kauffman	A theoretical biologist whose work in complex systems and self-organization highlighted the role of emergence in biological evolution and the origin of life. Kauffman emphasized the unpredictability and novelty of emergent biological properties.	The Origins of Order
Roger Sperry	Neuropsychologist and Nobel laureate, Sperry's split-brain research contributed to the understanding of consciousness as an emergent property of brain processes. He argued that emergent mental properties have causal efficacy that influences the lower-level neural processes.	Science and Moral Priority
Terrence Deacon	Anthropologist and neuroscientist, Deacon's work on the evolution of language and human cognition explored how emergent properties arise from neural and social interactions. His book Incomplete Nature delves into the emergentist explanation of life and mind.	Incomplete Nature: How Mind Emerged from Matter
Steven Johnson	An author and theorist whose popular science books, such as Emergence: The Connected Lives of Ants, Brains, Cities, and Software, have brought the concept of emergentism to a broader audience. Johnson illustrates how complex systems in nature and society exhibit emergent properties.	Emergence: The Connected Lives of Ants, Brains, Cities, and Software

== See also ==
- Abiogenesis – Life arising from non-living matter
- Anthropic principle – Hypothesis about sapient life and the universe
- Connectionism – Cognitive science approach
- Dual-phase evolution – Process that drives self-organization within complex adaptive systems
- Emergenesis – Result of a specific combination of several interacting genes
- Emergent algorithm – Algorithm exhibiting emergent behavior
- Emergent evolution – Evolutionary biology
- Emergent gameplay – Aspect of gameplay
- Emergent gravity – Theory in modern physics that describes gravity as an entropic force
- Emergent organization
- Emergentism – Philosophical view concerning consiousness
- Externality – Imposed cost or benefit in economics
- Free will – Ability to make choices voluntarily
- Generative science – Study of nature's complex behaviour systems
- Irreducible complexity – Argument by proponents of intelligent design
- Langton's ant – Two-dimensional Turing machine with emergent behavior
- Law of Complexity-Consciousness – Theoretical future event
- Libertarianism (metaphysics) – Term in metaphysics
- Mass action (sociology) – Simultaneous similar behavior of many people, without coordination
- Organic Wholes of G.E. Moore – English philosopher (1873–1958)
- Polytely – Problem-solving technique
- Society of Mind – Book by Marvin Minsky
- Superorganism – Group of synergistic organisms
- Swarm intelligence – Collective behavior of decentralized, self-organized systems
- System of systems – Collection of co-operating systems
- Spontaneous order – Theory of economy and sociology
- Mereology – Study of parts and the wholes they form
- Mereological nihilism – Ontological thesis
- Mereological essentialism – Thesis in philosophy that a whole ceases to exist if it loses a part
