= Downward causation =

Causal relationship in philosophy

In philosophy, downward causation is a causal relationship from higher levels of a system to lower-level parts of that system: for example, mental events acting to cause physical events. The term was originally coined in 1974 by the philosopher and social scientist Donald T. Campbell.

In science, downward causation is considered to be a causal interaction between two or more components that, in turn, influences the origin of that interaction. Cause and effect are thus reversed in an essentially recursive process. However, because it deals with the same interaction, this reversal is often more a function of the chosen perspective. The difference becomes clearer if there is any complex interaction of multiple components, leading to a new, emergent phenomenon: the emergent phenomenon itself can also conversely influence the behavior of its components. The emergent phenomenon then forms an attractor for neighboring components that are not yet involved in the interaction (for instance: clustering, condensation, crystallization). This is certainly the case with weak emergence. Whether this is also the case with strong emergence is a matter of philosophical debate.

In open, complex systems, downward causation is achieved through feedback from the environment. This is a very common phenomenon, especially in biological systems, such as an ecosystem and herd behavior. Adaptation is a similar phenomenon, often leading to a form of homeostasis.

== Examples ==
Practopoietic cycle of causation

According to practopoietic theory of system organization, downward causation in biological systems always involves the environment. Downward causation does not occur by direct causal effects from higher to lower levels of system organisation. Instead, downward causation occurs indirectly because the mechanisms at higher levels of organisation fail to accomplish the tasks dictated by the lower levels of organisation. As a result, inputs from the environment signal to the mechanisms at lower levels of organisation that something is wrong and therefore, to act. For example, a species may find itself under evolutionary pressure to adjust to novel circumstances—which is a form of downward pressure for adjustment. Similarly, an organism may be under downward pressure to express different genes if the expression patterns from the past did not lead to desired results. Another special case of downward causation is supervised learning (of neuronal networks) in which both behavior and environment govern the propagation from higher to lower levels.

This leads to a unique form of a causal interaction pattern—called a practopoietic loop (cycle) of causation. The end result is that the mechanisms responsible for mental events cause physical events only based on their joint interaction with the environment.

An interesting consequence is that neither behavior of an organism nor its mental operations can be considered fully or exclusively supervenient on the body of the organism. On the one hand, behavior is not supervenient on all parts of the body. On the other hand, due to the necessary interactions with the environment at all levels of organization, behavior is supervenient also on some aspects of the environment. The same holds for the mental operations, or the mind.

== See also ==
- Emergence
- Physicalism
- Reductionism
- Supervenience
