= Polychotomous key =

Polychotomous key refers to the number of alternatives which a decision point may have in a non-temporal hierarchy of independent variables. The number of alternatives are equivalent to the root or nth root of a mathematical or logical variable. Decision points or independent variables with two states have a binary root that is referred to as a dichotomous key whereas, the term polychotomous key refers to roots which are greater than one or unitary and usually greater than two or binary. Polychotomous keys are used in troubleshooting to build troubleshooting charts and in classification/identification schemes with characteristics that have more than one attribute and the order of characteristics is not inherently based on the progression of time.

== See also ==
- Number prefix
