= Sittlichkeit =

Hegelian moral-political concept

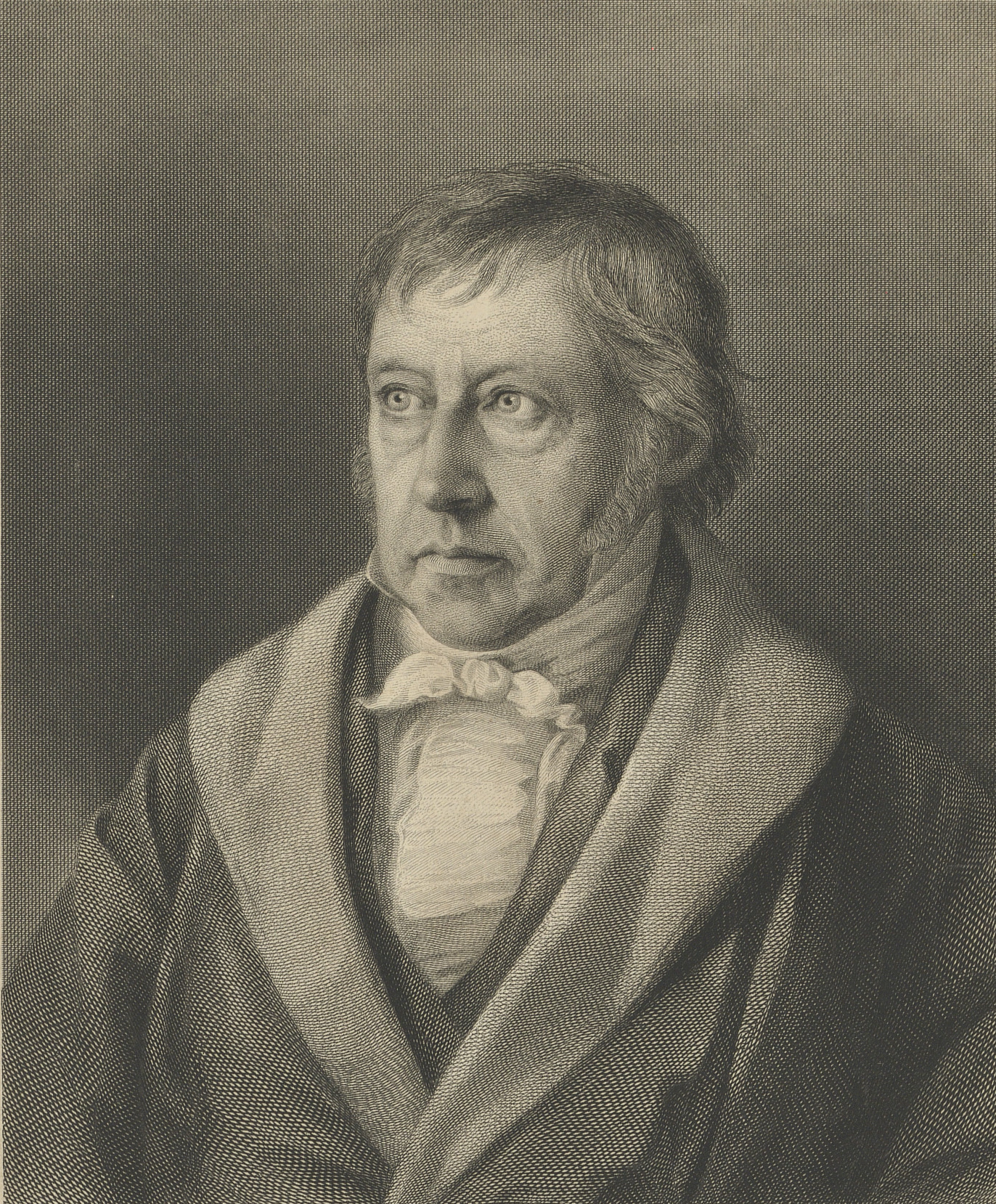
Georg Wilhelm Friedrich Hegel

Sittlichkeit (German: [ˈzɪtlɪçkaɪt]) is the concept of "ethical life" or "ethical order" furthered by German philosopher Georg Wilhelm Friedrich Hegel. It was first presented in his work Phenomenology of Spirit (1807) to refer to "ethical behavior grounded in custom and tradition and developed through habit and imitation in accordance with the objective laws of the community" and it was further developed in his work Elements of the Philosophy of Right (1820).

== The three spheres of right ==
In Elements of the Philosophy of Right, Hegel introduces the sphere of abstract right (Recht), as the first of the three spheres of right. It is marked by the concept of personality and the actions of the individuals. This sphere constitutes what Isaiah Berlin would call negative freedom, which is to say, freedom ascertained through the denial of outside impetus. This is the freedom traditionally represented by classical liberalism.

The second sphere constitutes Kantian morality, and is therefore called the sphere of morality (Moralität). This sphere constitutes what Isaiah Berlin would call positive freedom, which is to say, moral autonomy. However, Hegel criticizes the deployment of Kantian morality in society for being insufficient. He explains this deficiency through philosophical critique of pathologies such as loneliness, depression and agony.

The third sphere, the sphere of ethical life (Sittlichkeit), is marked by family life, civil society, and the State. This idea mediates between liberal and conservative polarities.

To properly understand the movement from the two first spheres to the last, one must understand that Sittlichkeit's normativity transcends the individual—while Moralität may be rational and reflective, it is also individualistic. The third sphere is an attempt at describing a limited conception of the person through an appeal to the greater institutional context of the community and an attempt at bridging individual subjective feelings and the concept of general rights.

== Influence ==
In the Vormärz period leading up to the Revolutions of 1848, some German thinkers, such as the liberal Carl Theodor Welcker, the conservative Friedrich Julius Stahl, and the communist Wilhelm Weitling, developed the idea of Sittlichkeit in various directions. Welcker connected the idea to constitutional liberties. Stahl related it to a hierarchical godly order. Weitling rejected the existing moral order as oppressive and argued that it must be destroyed in order to develop new values.

Conservative philosopher Roger Scruton called Sittlichkeit a highly original and metaphysically fascinating version of the conservative answer to liberalism. Slovenian Marxist philosopher Slavoj Žižek positioned Sittlichkeit as a response to the "decay of common morality and decency" represented by the populist right.
