= Intentional living =

Lifestyle

Intentional living is any lifestyle based on an individual's or group's conscious attempts to live according to their values and beliefs. These can include lifestyles based on religious, political or ethical values, as well as for self-improvement.

== Characteristics ==
=== History ===
In the first chapter of Christopher Isherwood's My Guru and his Disciple, written in 1940, the writer tells of conversations with Gerald Heard concerning Heard's spiritual values. In their conversations, Heard explains that he follows a lifestyle called "intentional living" (Isherwood put the phrase in quotes). Heard said that one of the hardest parts of the discipline was to be aware of one's own pretensions. "You may rid yourself of all worldly addictions and aversions… the most deadly pretension may raise its head. You may begin to believe you are a spiritually superior person…"

=== Steps ===
Intentional living requires one to be aware of one's fundamental beliefs and to be willing to make an effort to have one's behavior reflect these beliefs, in a form of integrity in relation to one's conscience and environment. In some cases, such changes are drastic enough that like-minded individuals group together in intentional communities.

According to the writer Joshua Becker, the steps involved in adopting intentional living can be summarised as:

- Realise that life is made of choices. Attitudes and decisions do not have to be determined by our past but can be chosen.
- We are surrounded by a culture. We can determine its direction and see if we want the same or not.
- Know who we are and what we want (to do, communicate, and contribute). Give time to our passions.

=== Aims ===
Some examples of intentional living include cohousing, ethical living, frugal living, moral community, simple living, sustainable living, as well as many religious lifestyles. Intentional communities, such as the Simple Way, the Bruderhof communities, and the Community of St Anselm are intentional communities based on Christian values and beliefs.

While not necessarily representing distinct or actual lifestyles, many themes and areas of human interest, activity, and study exist that contribute to intentional living. Examples include appropriate technology, conservation, ecology, environmentalism, humanism, humanitarianism, and socially responsible investing.

== See also ==
- Car-free movement
- Eco-communalism
- Ecovillage
- FIRE movement
- Ideal (ethics)
- Incarnation
- Mindfulness
- Missional living
- Noah Hoover Mennonite
- Orthodox Mennonites
- Real freedom
- Self-actualization
- Self-expression values
- Simple living
- Veganism
- World Brotherhood Colonies
