= Mundane reason =

The basic premise of the concept of mundane reason is that the standard assumptions about reality that people typically make as they go about day to day, including the very fact that they experience their reality as perfectly natural, are actually the result of social, cultural, and historical processes that make a particular perception of the world readily available. It is the reasoning about the world, self, and others which presupposes the world and its relationship to the observer; according to Steven Shapin (Shapin 1994:31), it is a set of presuppositions about the subject, the object, and the nature of their relations.
