= Emergenesis =

Result of a specific combination of several interacting genes

In psychology, a trait (or phenotype) is called emergenic if it is the result of a specific combination of several interacting genes (rather than of a simple sum of several independent genes). Emergenic traits will not run in families, but identical twins will share them. Traits such as "leadership", "genius" or certain mental illnesses may be emergenic. Although one may expect epigenetics to play a significant role in the phenotypic manifestation of twins reared apart, the concordance displayed between them can be attributed to emergenesis.
