= Negative liberty =

Freedom from interference by other people

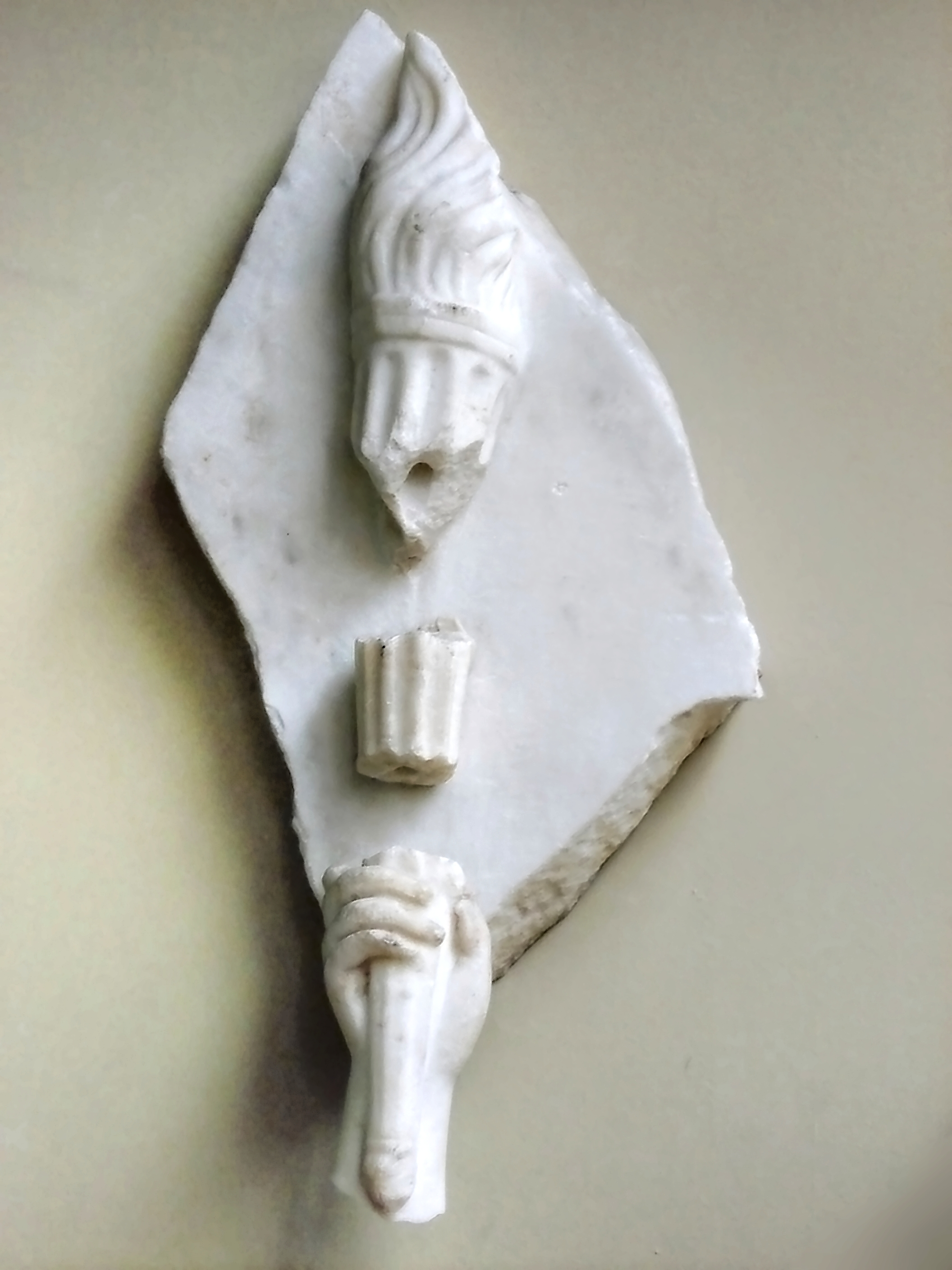
Torch of liberty from antiquity at the Istanbul Archaeology Museums

Negative liberty, or negative freedom, is freedom from interference by other people. Negative liberty is primarily concerned with freedom from external restraint and contrasts with positive liberty (the possession of the power and resources to fulfill one's own potential). The distinction originated with Bentham, was popularized by T. H. Green and Guido De Ruggiero, and is now best known through Isaiah Berlin's 1958 lecture "Two Concepts of Liberty".

== Overview ==
The Stanford Encyclopedia of Philosophy describes negative liberty:

The negative concept of freedom ... is most commonly assumed in liberal defences of the constitutional liberties typical of liberal-democratic societies, such as freedom of movement, freedom of religion, and freedom of speech, and in arguments against paternalist or moralist state intervention. It is also often invoked in defences of the right to private property, although some have contested the claim that private property necessarily enhances negative liberty.

== History ==
According to Thomas Hobbes, "a free man is he that in those things which by his strength and wit he is able to do is not hindered to do what he hath the will to do" (Leviathan, Part 2, Ch. XXI; thus alluding to liberty in its negative sense).

Claude Adrien Helvétius expressed the following point clearly: "The free man is the man who is not in irons, nor imprisoned in a gaol, nor terrorized like a slave by the fear of punishment ... it is not lack of freedom, not to fly like an eagle or swim like a whale." Moreover, John Jay, in The Federalist paper No. 2, stated that: "Nothing is more certain than the indispensable necessity of Government, and it is equally undeniable, that whenever and however it is instituted, the people must cede to it some of their natural rights, in order to vest it with requisite powers." Jay's meaning would be better expressed by substituting "negative liberty" in place of "natural rights", for the argument here is that the power or authority of a legitimate government derives in part from our accepting restrictions on negative liberty. This notion resonates with Benjamin Franklin's assertion that "Those who would give up essential Liberty, to purchase a little temporary Safety, deserve neither Liberty nor Safety", highlighting the delicate balance between individual freedoms and governmental authority.

An idea that anticipates the distinction between negative and positive liberty was G. F. W. Hegel's "sphere of abstract right" (furthered in his Elements of the Philosophy of Right), which constitutes what now is called negative freedom and his subsequent distinction between "abstract" and "positive liberty".

In the Anglophone analytic tradition, the distinction between negative and positive liberty was introduced by Isaiah Berlin in his 1958 lecture "Two Concepts of Liberty". According to Berlin, the distinction is deeply embedded in the political tradition. In Berlin's words, "Liberty in the negative sense involves an answer to the question: 'What is the area within which the subject—a person or group of persons—is or should be left to do or be what he is able to do or be, without interference by other persons'." Restrictions on negative liberty are imposed by a person, not by natural causes or incapacity.

Frankfurt School psychoanalyst and humanistic philosopher Erich Fromm drew a similar distinction between negative and positive freedom in his 1941 work, The Fear of Freedom, that predates Berlin's essay by more than a decade. Fromm sees the distinction between the two types of freedom emerging alongside humanity's evolution away from the instinctual activity that characterizes lower animal forms. This aspect of freedom, he argues, "is here used not in its positive sense of 'freedom to' but in its negative sense of 'freedom from'; namely freedom from the instinctual determination of his actions." For Fromm, then, negative freedom marks the beginning of humanity as a species conscious of its own existence free from base instinct.

The distinction between positive and negative liberty is considered specious by some socialist and Marxist political philosophers, who argue that positive and negative liberty are indistinguishable in practice, or that one cannot exist without the other. Although he is not a socialist nor a Marxist, Berlin argues:

It follows that a frontier must be drawn between the area of private life and that of public authority. Where it is to be drawn is a matter of argument, indeed of haggling. Men are largely interdependent, and no man's activity is so completely private as never to obstruct the lives of others in any way. 'Freedom for the pike is death for the minnows'; the liberty of some must depend on the restraint of others.

Objectivist thinker Tibor Machan defends negative liberty as "required for moral choice and, thus, for human flourishing", claiming that it "is secured when the rights of individual members of a human community to life, to voluntary action (or to liberty of conduct), and to property are universally respected, observed, and defended."

According to Charles Taylor, freedom means being able to do what you want, without any external obstacles. This concept has been criticized for being too simplistic and not taking into account the importance of individual self-realization. He thus suggests that negative liberty is little more than a philosophical term and that real liberty is achieved when significant social and economic inequalities are also considered. He proposed dialectical positive liberty as a means to gaining both negative and positive liberty, by overcoming the inequalities that divide us. According to Taylor, positive liberty is the ability to fulfill one's purposes, while negative liberty is the freedom from interference by others.

Timothy Snyder argues that only focusing on negative freedom leads to oligarchy.

== Monarchy example ==
Thomas Hobbes' Leviathan outlines a commonwealth based upon a monarchy to whom citizens have ceded their rights. The basic reasoning for his assertion that this system was most ideal relates more to his value of order and simplicity in government. The monarchy provides for its subjects, and its subjects go about their day-to-day lives without interaction with the government:

The commonwealth is instituted when all agree in the following manner: I authorise and give up my right of governing myself to this man, or to this assembly of men, on this condition; that thou give up, thy right to him, and authorise all his actions in like manner.

The sovereign has twelve principal rights:

1. because a successive covenant cannot override a prior one, the subjects cannot (lawfully) change the form of government.
2. because the covenant forming the commonwealth is the subjects giving to the sovereign the right to act for them, the sovereign cannot possibly breach the covenant; and therefore the subjects can never argue to be freed from the covenant because of the actions of the sovereign.
3. the selection of sovereign is (in theory) by majority vote; the minority have agreed to abide by this.
4. every subject is author of the acts of the sovereign: hence the sovereign cannot injure any of his subjects, and cannot be accused of injustice.
5. following this, the sovereign cannot justly be put to death by the subjects.
6. because the purpose of the commonwealth is peace, and the sovereign has the right to do whatever he thinks necessary for the preserving of peace and security and prevention of discord, therefore the sovereign may judge what opinions and doctrines are averse; who shall be allowed to speak to multitudes; and who shall examine the doctrines of all books before they are published.
7. to prescribe the rules of civil law and property.
8. to be judge in all cases.
9. to make war and peace as he sees fit; and to command the army.
10. to choose counsellors, ministers, magistrates and officers.
11. to reward with riches and honour; or to punish with corporal or pecuniary punishment or ignominy.
12. to establish laws of honour and a scale of worth.

Hobbes explicitly rejects the idea of separation of powers, in particular the form that would later be applied under the United States Constitution. Part 6 is a perhaps underemphasised feature of his argument, explicitly in favour of censorship of the press and restrictions on the rights of free speech, should they be considered desirable by the sovereign in order to promote order.

Upon closer inspection of Leviathan, it is clear he believed a person in society must give up liberty to a sovereign. Whether that sovereign is an absolute monarch or other form was left open to debate. He viewed the absolute monarch as the best of all options, writing:

For as amongst masterless men, there is perpetual war, of every man against his neighbour; no inheritance, to transmit to the son, nor to expect from the father; no propriety of goods, or lands; no security; but a full and absolute liberty in every particular man: so in states, and commonwealths not dependent on one another, every commonwealth, not every man, has an absolute liberty, to do what it shall judge, that is to say, what that man, or assembly that representeth it, shall judge most conducing to their benefit.

== See also ==
- Mutual liberty
- Negative and positive rights
- Non-aggression principle
- Real freedom
- Self-ownership
