= Philippe Van Parijs =

Belgian political philosopher and political economist (born 1951)

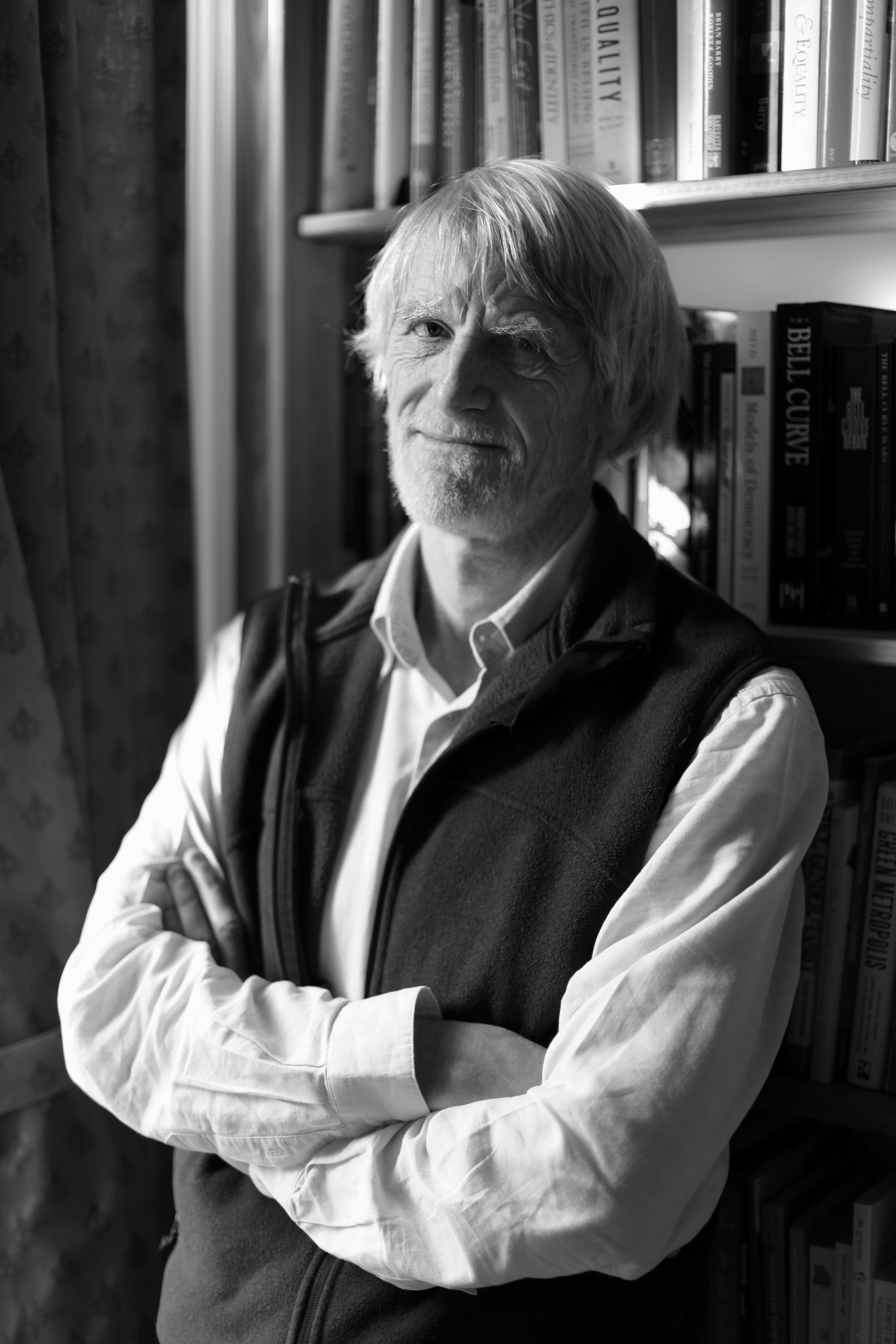
- Born: Philippe Van Parijs; 23 May 1951 (age 75); Brussels, Belgium

Education
- Education: UC Berkeley; Bielefeld University; Oxford University; Université catholique de Louvain; Saint-Louis University, Brussels
- Doctoral advisor: Jean Ladrière

Philosophical work
- Era: Contemporary philosophy
- Region: Western philosophy
- School: Analytical Marxism; Left-libertarianism
- Institutions: Nuffield College, Oxford, Université catholique de Louvain, Harvard University
- Main interests: Political philosophy, political economy, distributive justice
- Notable ideas: Universal basic income, linguistic justice, language tax, real freedom

Philippe Van Parijs (French: [filip vɑ̃ paʁɛjs]; born 23 May 1951) is a Belgian political philosopher and political economist, best known as a proponent and main defender of the concept of an unconditional basic income and for the first systematic treatment of linguistic justice.

In 2020, he was listed by Prospect as the eighth-greatest thinker for the COVID-19 era, with the magazine writing, "Today’s young UBI enthusiasts draw on the books and tap the networks of this Belgian polymath, who championed it before it was fashionable. For decades, he has warned that our proclaimed freedoms to start businesses or raise children count for nothing without the real freedom that comes with a basic income".

== Early life and education ==
Van Parijs studied philosophy, law, political economy, sociology and linguistics at the Université Saint-Louis - Bruxelles in Brussels, at the Université catholique de Louvain (UCLouvain) in Louvain-la-Neuve, at the Katholieke Universiteit Leuven (KU Leuven) in Leuven, in Oxford, Bielefeld and California (Berkeley). He holds doctorates in the social sciences (Louvain, 1977) and in philosophy (Oxford, 1980).

== Career ==
He is professor at the Faculty of Economic, Social and Political Sciences of the University of Louvain (UCLouvain), where he directs the Hoover Chair of Economic and Social Ethics since its creation in 1991. He was a visiting professor at Harvard University's Department of Philosophy from 2004 to 2011, and has been a visiting professor at the Higher Institute of Philosophy of the Katholieke Universiteit Leuven since 2006, and a senior research fellow at Nuffield College, Oxford, since 2011.

Van Parijs has also held visiting positions at the Universities of Amsterdam, Manchester, Siena, Québec (Montréal), Wisconsin (Madison), Maine (Orono) and Aix-Marseille, the European University Institute (Florence), the Russian Academy of Sciences (Moscow), the Federal University of Rio de Janeiro, the Chinese Academy of Social Sciences (Beijing), the Catholic Faculties of Kinshasa (Congo), All Souls College (Oxford), Yale University, Sciences Po (Paris), the Catholic University of Uruguay, the Autonomous University of Barcelona and the École Normale Supérieure (Paris).

He is one of the founders of the Basic Income European Network (BIEN) in 1986, which became the Basic Income Earth Network in 2004, and he chairs its International Board. He coordinates the Ethical Forum of the University Foundation. He also coordinates the Pavia Group with Kris Deschouwer and, with Paul De Grauwe, the Re-Bel initiative. He is a member of Belgium's Royal Academy of Sciences, Letters and Fine Arts, of the International Institute of Philosophy, and of the European Academy of Sciences and Arts and fellow of the British Academy. In 2001, he was awarded the Francqui Prize. He became a chair on the Brussels Council for Multilingualism in 2020.

== Work ==
=== Basic income ===
In Real Freedom for All: What (if anything) can justify capitalism? (1995) he argues for both the justice and feasibility of a basic income for every citizen (UBI). Van Parijs asserts that it promotes the achievement of a real freedom to make choices. For example, he purports that one cannot really choose to stay at home to raise children or start a business if one cannot afford to. As proposed by Van Parijs, such freedom should be feasible through taxing the scarce, valued social good of jobs, as a form of income redistribution. In a 2025 interview, Van Parijs stated that artificial intelligence would lead to further wealth and power inequality, which could be counteracted with the implementation of UBI.

=== Linguistic justice ===
Another part of Van Parijs' work is about linguistic justice. In order to address the injustice arising from the privilege enjoyed by English as a global lingua franca, he discusses a wide range of measures such as a language tax which would be paid by English-speaking countries, a ban on the dubbing of films, and the enforcement of a linguistic territoriality principle that would protect weaker languages.

Van Parijs's work is sometimes associated with the September Group of analytic Marxism, though he is not himself a Marxist. He has described his political philosophy as "left-Rawlsian" and "globalist".

== Honours ==
- Ailsa McKay Lecture, 2017
- Francqui Prize, 2001
- Permanent member, Institut international de philosophie, 1999.

== Bibliography ==
Van Parijs' books include:

- Evolutionary Explanation in the Social Sciences (1981)
- Le Modèle économique et ses rivaux (1990)
- Qu'est-ce qu'une société juste? (1991)
- Marxism Recycled (1993)
- Real Freedom for All (1995)
- Sauver la solidarité (1995)
- Refonder la solidarité (1996)
- Solidariteit voor de XXIste eeuw (1997)
- Ethique économique et sociale (2000, with C. Arnsperger)
- What's Wrong with a Free Lunch? (2001)
- Hacia una concepción de la justicia global (2002)
- Cultural Diversity versus Economic Solidarity (as editor, 2004)
- L'Allocation universelle (2005, with Y. Vanderborght)
- Linguistic Justice for Europe and for the World (2011)
- Just Democracy. The Rawls-Machiaveli Programme (2011)
- Basic Income: A Radical Proposal for a Free Society and a Sane Economy (2017)

Festschrift in honour of Van Parijs

- Arguing About Justice: Essays for Philippe Van Parijs (Axel Gosseries & Yannick Vanderborght eds., Presses universitaires de Louvain, 2012) was published on the occasion of his 60th birthday.
