= Composition of causes =

The composition of causes was a set of philosophical laws advanced by John Stuart Mill in his watershed essay A System of Logic. These laws outlined Mill's view of the epistemological components of emergentism, a school of philosophical laws that posited a decidedly opportunistic approach to the classic dilemma of causation nullification.

Mill defined the “composition of causes” as the principle that when two or more causal forces act together, each retains its own efficacy and the combined effect is the sum of their separate effects. He argued that this principle holds in most natural phenomena, while also noting that in some cases the interaction of causes may produce new effects not predictable from the individual causes alone.

Furthermore, the composition of causes elevated Mill's standing in ontological circles, lauded by his contemporaries for applying a conceptual vision of an often-argued discipline.
