= Eupraxis =

Concept in virtue ethics

In pedagogy, eupraxis or eupraxia (Ancient Greek: εὐπραξία, lit. 'right action') is an "ethical life-stance", similar in meaning to eupraxsophy, a word coined in the 20th century by secular humanist philosopher Paul Kurtz.

For Aristotle, eupraxia, defined as 'acting well', has three components. One must not merely do the right thing, but choose to do it for the right reasons and do it habitually.
