= Mutual liberty =

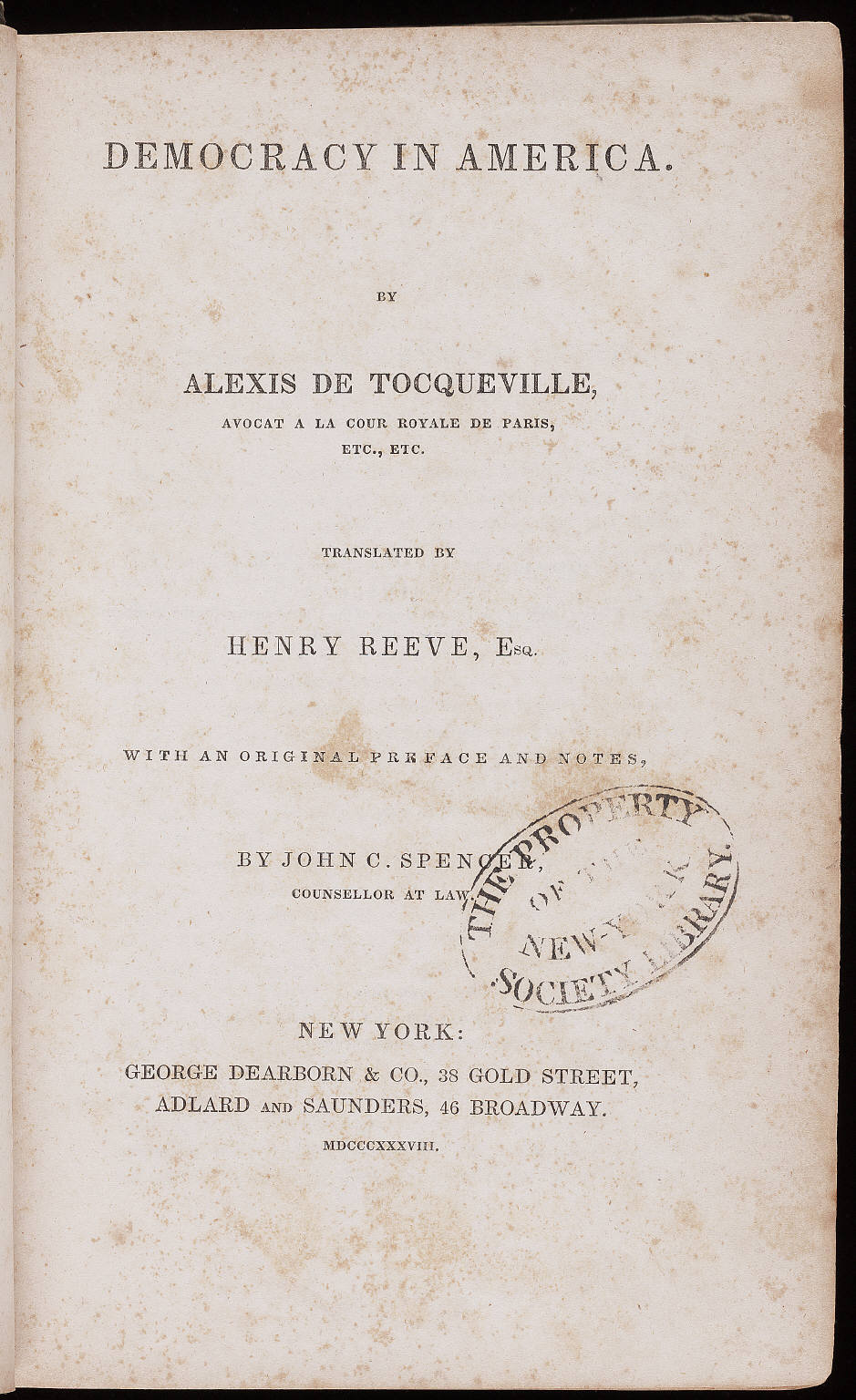
Cover of the book Democracy in America, in which the concept was introduced.

Mutual liberty is an idea first developed by Alexis de Tocqueville in his 1835 work Democracy in America. He referred to the general nature of American society during the 19th century. It appeared to him, on the surface, that every citizen had the opportunity to participate in the country's civic activities.

John Stuart Mill expanded the notion. He posited that the most proper occasion for mutual liberty was in a community governed by the consent of the governed and argued that only in a republic may members of all political factions participate.
