= Two Concepts of Liberty =

1958 ethics lecture by Isaiah Berlin

"Two Concepts of Liberty" was the inaugural lecture delivered by the liberal philosopher Isaiah Berlin before the University of Oxford on 31 October 1958. It was subsequently published as a 57-page pamphlet by Oxford at the Clarendon Press. It also appears in the collection of Berlin's papers entitled Four Essays on Liberty (1969) and was reissued in a collection entitled Liberty: Incorporating Four Essays on Liberty (2002).

The essay, with its analytical approach to the definition of political concepts, re-introduced the study of political philosophy to the methods of analytic philosophy. It is also one of Berlin's first expressions of his ethical ontology of value-pluralism. Berlin defined negative liberty (as the term "liberty" was used by Thomas Hobbes) as the absence of coercion or interference with agents' possible private actions, by an exterior social body. He also defined it as a comparatively recent political ideal, which re-emerged in the late 17th century, after its slow and inarticulate birth in the ancient doctrines of Antiphon the Sophist, the Cyrenaic discipleship, and of Otanes after the death of pseudo-Smerdis. In an introduction to the essay, Berlin writes:

As for Otanes, he wished neither to rule nor to be ruled—the exact opposite of Aristotle's notion of true civic liberty.... [This ideal] remains isolated and, until Epicurus, undeveloped ... the notion had not explicitly emerged.

== Summary ==
Berlin initially defined negative liberty as "freedom from", that is, the absence of constraints on the agent imposed by other people. He defined positive liberty both as "freedom to", that is, the ability (not just the opportunity) to pursue and achieve willed goals; and also as autonomy or self-rule, as opposed to dependence on others.

=== Negative liberty ===
Berlin said that negative liberty is:

liberty in the negative sense involves an answer to the question: 'What is the area within which the subject—a person or group of persons—is or should be left to do or be what he is able to do or be, without interference by other persons?'

For Berlin, negative liberty represents a different, and sometimes contradictory, understanding of the concept of liberty, which needs to be carefully examined. Its later proponents (such as Tocqueville, Constant, Montesquieu, John Locke, David Hume and John Stuart Mill, who accepted Chrysippus' understanding of self-determination) insisted that constraint and discipline were the antithesis of liberty and so were (and are) less prone to confusing liberty and constraint in the manner of rationalists and the philosophical harbingers of totalitarianism. This concept of negative liberty, Berlin argued, constitutes an alternative, and sometimes even opposed, concept to positive liberty, and one often closer to the intuitive modern usage of the word. Berlin considered negative liberty one of the distinguishing concepts of modern liberalism and observed that:

The fathers of liberalism—Mill and Constant—want more than this minimum: they demand a maximum degree of non-interference compatible with the minimum demands of social life. It seems unlikely that this extreme demand for liberty has ever been made by any but a small minority of highly civilized and self-conscious human beings.

=== Positive liberty ===
Berlin said that positive liberty:

is involved in the answer to the question 'What, or who, is the source of control or interference that can determine someone to do, or be, this rather than that?'

Positive liberty may be understood as self-mastery. Berlin granted that both concepts of liberty represent valid human ideals, and that both forms of liberty are necessary in any free and civilised society.

=== Suggestions that positive liberty is "abuse" in context ===
Isaiah Berlin notes that historically positive liberty has proven particularly susceptible to rhetorical abuse; especially from the 18th century onwards, it has either been paternalistically re-drawn from the third-person, or conflated with the concept of negative liberty and thus disguised underlying value-conflicts. Historical actors such as Thomas Jefferson did deploy and distinguish "public liberty" and "personal liberty", which have, in turn, been equated with, and also differentiated from, Berlin's two concepts.

Berlin contended that under the influence of Plato, Aristotle, Jean-Jacques Rousseau, Immanuel Kant, and G. W. F. Hegel, modern political thinkers often conflated positive liberty with rational action, based upon a rational knowledge to which, it is argued, only a certain elite or social group has access. This rationalist conflation was open to political abuses, which encroached on negative liberty, when such interpretations of positive liberty were, in the nineteenth century, used to defend nationalism, paternalism, social engineering, historicism, and collective rational control over human destiny. Berlin argued that, following this line of thought, demands for freedom paradoxically could become demands for forms of collective control and discipline—those deemed necessary for the "self-mastery" or "self-determination" of nations, classes, democratic communities, and even humanity as a whole. There is thus an elective affinity, for Berlin, between positive liberty, when it is rhetorically conflated with goals imposed from the third-person that the individual is told they "should" rationally desire, and the justifications for political totalitarianism, which contrary to value-pluralism, presupposed that values exist in Pythagorean harmony.

=== Dialectic of positive and negative liberty ===
Berlin did not argue that the concept of positive liberty should be rejected—on the contrary, he recognised it as one human value among many, and one necessary to any free society. He argued that positive liberty was a genuine and valuable version of liberty, so long as it was identified with the autonomy of individuals, and not with the achievement of goals that individuals 'ought to' 'rationally' desire. Berlin argued, rather, that these differing concepts showed the plurality and incompatibility of human values, and the need to analytically distinguish and trade off between, rather than conflate, them.

Thus, Berlin offers in his "Two Concepts of Liberty" essay:

Where it is to be drawn is a matter of argument, indeed of haggling. Men are largely interdependent, and no man's activity is so completely private as never to obstruct the lives of others in any way. 'Freedom for the pike is death for the minnows'; the liberty of some must depend on the restraint of others. Freedom for an Oxford don, others have been known to add, is a very different thing from freedom for an Egyptian peasant.

== Criticism ==
In contrast to Berlin, Charles Taylor argues that the Hobbes-Bentham view is indefensible as a view of freedom. Faced with this two-step process, it seems safer and easier to stop it at the first step, to insist firmly that freedom is just a matter of the absence of external obstacles, that it, therefore, involves no discrimination of motivation and permits in principle no second-guessing of the subject by anyone else. Taylor suggests that this is the essence of the Maginot Line strategy and it is very tempting, as a line of argument. But, claims it is wrong, we cannot defend a view of freedom that does not involve at least some qualitative discrimination as to motive, that is which does not put some restrictions on motivation among the necessary conditions for freedom, and hence which could rule out second-guessing in principle.

Taylor, therefore, argues for a distinction between negative and positive liberty that highlights the importance of social justice. Therefore, if social justice is a major part of equality, then liberty is not a synonym of lack of obstacles, but being able to grasp those obstacles, to discuss and work to overcome them.

In 2006, historian Bernard Bailyn published a critique of "perfectionist ideas" found in "Two Concepts of Liberty." He triangulated his own approach with Berlin's "embattled position in defense of a liberal alternative" and "perfectionist ideas", the latter a result of positive liberty as a totality. Bailyn introduced his final collection of essays by asserting that "Isaiah Berlin was wrong in his entertaining game of classifying writers and thinkers into hedgehogs, who focus on one great theme, and foxes, who study and write about many themes and see the world through many lenses--wrong at least as far as historians are concerned. Many, like me, are both. Repeatedly I have been involved deeply and at length in a single absorbing subject, then have moved on to another, but touching, as I go along, smaller interests that come and go. Diverse as my interests have been, however, they reflect my intention in studying history".

G. A. Cohen similarly believed that "effective freedom" (Cohen never employed "positive liberty") could not be realized without "negative liberty." He also observed that, on the one hand, Berlin "thought that the claims of socialist planning were illusory", but on the other, Berlin was "passionately against Thatcherism: he knew that 'free' markets [could] destroy people's lives" without limited public spending in impacted sectors, ultimately to revive consumption. Cohen's thesis, however, was not civil liberties and "free" markets, with limited public spending, to advance "negative liberty." Cohen instead argued that "poverty" and "lack of money" impinged on all aspects of "negative liberty", not solely "effective freedom." Cohen added that this "counter-argument...will not detach hard-core 'libertarians' from their political position, but that is precisely because, despite their rhetoric, they do not care about liberty or freedom as such."

In the introduction, Cohen clarified the purposes of his essay. He demurred "that the conceptual part of the right-wing argument" had substantially impacted "academic thought" that he defended as not "right-wing." Berlin's thought, for instance, "advocated the conceptual part of the right-wing argument, which culminates in...[the proposition that poverty] does not carry with it lack of freedom." Berlin, however, refused to accept the premise that "the primary task of government is to protect freedom." This refusal allowed him to circumvent "the right’s normative conclusion", that is, Berlin did not have to endorse the "right-wing" claim that the "relief of poverty is not part of the primary task of government."

According to Matt Zwilonski, Cohen depicted "the poor" as lacking "negative freedom from liability to physical interference by other human beings" because "money" is "socially enforced...without the fact that behind money and property institutions more generally there are men with guns standing ready to enforce the claims they represent--money would be nothing." Zwilonski differentiated "being poor" from "disabilities" and connected topics.

== See also ==
- Positive and negative rights
