= Real freedom =

Term coined by philosopher Philippe Van Parijs

Real freedom is a term coined by the political philosopher and economist Philippe Van Parijs. It expands upon notions of negative freedom by incorporating not simply institutional or other constraints on a person's choices, but also the requirements of physical reality, resources and personal capacity. To have real freedom, according to Van Parijs, an individual must:

1. not be prevented from acting on their will (i.e. they must have traditional negative freedom)
2. possess the resources or capacities actually to carry out their will.

Under this conception, a moral agent could be negatively free to take a holiday in Miami, because no-one is forcing them not to (condition 1 is met); but not really free to do so, because they cannot afford the flight (condition 2 is not met). Similarly, someone could be negatively free to swim across the English Channel; but not really free, because they are not a good enough swimmer and would not be able to succeed in the task. Real freedom is, then, a matter of degree — one is more or less really free, not just either really free or not; and no-one has complete real freedom yet — no-one is currently really free to teleport to Mars, for instance.

== Politics ==
Van Parijs uses the concept of real freedom as part of his influential argument for a universal basic income.

== See also ==
- Basic income
- Freedom Dividend
- Independence
- Individual freedom
- Intentional living
- Negative liberty
- Positive liberty
- Power (social and political)
