= Positive liberty =

Ability to fulfill one's purposes

Positive liberty, or positive freedom, is the possession of the power and resources to act in the context of the structural limitations of the broader society which impacts a person's ability to act, as opposed to negative liberty, which is freedom from external restraint on one's actions.

The concepts of structure and agency are central to the concept of positive liberty because in order to be free, a person should be free from inhibitions of the social structure in carrying out their ambitions. Structurally, classism, sexism, ageism, ableism and racism can inhibit a person's freedom. As positive liberty is primarily concerned with the possession of sociological agency, it is enhanced by the ability of citizens to participate in government and have their voices, interests, and concerns recognized and acted upon.

Isaiah Berlin's essay "Two Concepts of Liberty" (1958) is typically acknowledged as the first to explicitly draw the distinction between positive and negative liberty.

== Overview ==
Timothy Snyder argues that positive freedom is necessary for flourishing democracies and societies, whereas negative freedom is more conducive to autocrats.

Charles Taylor distinguishes positive freedom from negative freedom, which defines freedom exclusively in terms of the independence of the individual from interference by others, be these governments, corporations, or private persons; this theory is challenged by those who believe that freedom resides at least in part in collective control over the common life. He criticizes negative liberty for being too simplistic and not taking into account the importance of individual self-realization, while real liberty is achieved when significant social and economic inequalities are also considered.

== History ==
Jean-Jacques Rousseau's theory of freedom, according to which individual freedom is achieved through participation in the process whereby one's community exercises collective control over its own affairs in accordance with the "general will". He wrote: "The mere impulse to appetite is slavery, while obedience to law we prescribe ourselves is liberty." For him, the passage from the state of nature to the civil state substitutes justice for instinct gives his actions the morality they had formerly lacked.

G. W. F. Hegel wrote in his Elements of the Philosophy of Right (in the part in which he introduced the concept of the sphere of abstract right) that "duty is not a restriction on freedom, but only on freedom in the abstract" and that "duty is the attainment of our essence, the winning of positive freedom".

In the Anglophone analytic tradition, the distinction between negative and positive liberty was introduced by Isaiah Berlin in his 1958 lecture "Two Concepts of Liberty".

== Examples ==
In the description of positive liberty from the Stanford Encyclopedia of Philosophy,

Put in the simplest terms, one might say that a democratic society is a free society because it is a self-determined society, and that a member of that society is free to the extent that he or she participates in its democratic process. But there are also individualist applications of the concept of positive freedom. For example, it is sometimes said that a government should aim actively to create the conditions necessary for people to be self-sufficient or to achieve self-realization.

In "Recovering the Social Contract", Ron Replogle made a metaphor that he believed to be helpful in understanding positive liberty. "Surely, it is no assault on my dignity as a person if you take my car keys, against my will, when I have had too much to drink. There is nothing paradoxical about making an agreement beforehand providing for paternalistic supervision in circumstances when our competence is open to doubt." In this sense, positive liberty is the adherence to a set of rules agreed upon by all parties involved, all of whom must agree to any alterations to the rules. Therefore, positive liberty is a contractarian philosophy.

Isaiah Berlin opposed any suggestion that paternalism and positive liberty could be equivalent. He stated that positive liberty could only apply when the withdrawal of liberty from a person was in pursuit of a choice that he or she made, not a general principle of society or any other person's opinion. In the case where a person removes a driver's car keys against their will because they have had too much to drink, this constitutes positive freedom only if the driver has made, of their own free will, an earlier decision not to drive drunk. Thus, by removing the keys, the other person facilitates this decision and ensures that it will be upheld in the face of paradoxical behaviour (i.e., drinking) by the driver. For the remover to remove the keys in the absence of such an expressed intent by the driver, because the remover feels that the driver ought not to drive drunk, is paternalism, and not positive freedom by Berlin's definition.

Erich Fromm sees the distinction between the two types of freedom emerging alongside humanity's evolution away from the instinctual activity that characterizes lower animal forms. This aspect of freedom, he argues, "is here used not in its positive sense of 'freedom to' but in its negative sense of 'freedom from', namely freedom from instinctual determination of his actions." For Fromm, freedom from animal instinct implicitly implies that survival now hinges on the necessity of charting one's own course. He relates this distinction to the biblical story of man's expulsion from Eden:

Acting against God's orders means freeing himself from coercion, emerging from the unconscious existence of prehuman life to the level of man. Acting against the command of authority, committing a sin is in its positive human aspect, the first act of freedom, that is, the first human act.

Positive freedom, Fromm maintains, comes through the actualization of individuality in balance with the separation from the whole: a "solidarity with all men", united not by instinctual or predetermined ties, but on the basis of a freedom founded on reason.

== See also ==
- Mutual liberty
- Negative and positive rights
- Real freedom
- Rule according to higher law
- The Trap (TV documentary series)
