= John Simmons =

John Simmons may refer to:

== Politicians ==
- John H. Simmons (died 1843), American politician from Maryland
- John Simmons (Oklahoma politician) (died 1940), American politician, mayor of Tulsa from 1916 to 1918
- John Simmons (Missouri politician), member of the Missouri House of Representatives

== Sports ==
- John Simmons (American football) (born 1958), American football defensive back
- John Simmons (American football end) (1939–2019), American football end
- John Simmons (baseball) (1920–2008), American baseball and basketball player
- John Simmons (canoeist) (1912–2005), British canoeist in the 1940s
- Jonathon Simmons (born 1989), American basketball player
- John Simmons (runner) (born 1911), American middle-distance runner, 3rd in the 800 m at the 1933 USA Outdoor Track and Field Championships

== Music ==
- John Simmons (musician) (1918–1979), American musician
- John Simmons (conductor) (1943–1988), American conductor, musical arranger, soul singer and keyboardist

== Acting ==
- Jon Simmons, American actor and talent manager
- John Simmons (actor) (born 1955), founder, Gross National Product Comedy Group
- Johnny Simmons (born 1986), actor

== Others ==
- John Simmons (clothing manufacturer) (1796–1870), Massachusetts clothing manufacturer and founder of Simmons College
- John Simmons (horticulturist) (born 1937), British horticulturist, former curator of the Royal Botanic Gardens, Kew
- John Simon Gabriel Simmons (1915–2005), British scholar
- John Simmons (painter) (1823–1876), British painter
- John Simmons (trade unionist) (born 1852), Irish trade union leader
- John F. Simmons (1892–1968), United States Chief of Protocol
- A. John Simmons (born 1950), American political philosopher

== See also ==
- Jack Simmons (disambiguation)
- John Simmonds (disambiguation)
- John Symonds (disambiguation)
- Jonathan Simons (born 1958), doctor
