= John Simonds =

John Simonds may refer to:

- John O. Simonds, American landscape architect, planner, educator, and environmentalist
- John Simonds (trade unionist), British trade union leader

== See also ==
- John Symonds (disambiguation)
- John Simmonds (disambiguation)
