= John Simmonds =

John Simmonds may refer to:

- John Simmonds (musician) in Another Joe
- John Simmonds (producer) of Beyond Our Ken
- John Simmonds (motorcyclist) in 1963 Grand Prix motorcycle racing season
- John Simmonds (political candidate), see Electoral results for the district of Melbourne
- John Simmonds, character played by Clancy Brown

== See also ==
- John Simonds (disambiguation)
- John Symonds (disambiguation)
- John Simmons (disambiguation)
