= Jack Simmons =

Jack Simmons may refer to:

- Jack Simmons (historian) (1915–2000), historian
- Jack Simmons (American football) (1924–1978), NFL player for the Chicago Cardinals
- Jack Simmons (cricketer) (born 1941), former cricketer who played for Lancashire and Tasmania
- Jack Simmons (soccer) (born 2002), Australian footballer for Newcastle Jets

== See also ==
- John Simmons (disambiguation)
