= John Simmons (actor) =

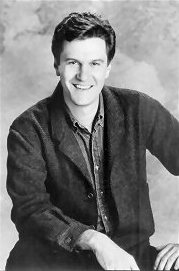
- John Simmons, GNP Comedy
- Born: Fort Belvoir, Virginia, U.S.
- Known for: Gross National Product

John Simmons (born November 23, 1955) is an American actor, comedian, writer director and television producer.

He founded Gross National Product Comedy(GNP) and Washington, D.C.'s Scandal Tours, and serves as GNP's "UnArtistic Director". His career combines political comedy revues, television satire and performances at Washington location associated with political scandals.

Simmons attended the University of North Carolina and then spent a year abroad at the University of Kent in Canterbury. He began Gross National Product, a Washington, D.C.-based traveling satirical comedy troupe, in 1980 while working as a reporter. According to the Los Angeles Times, Simmons "does a fairly accurate George Bush" impression. SDNews said about his performance that Simmons "did a brilliant job summoning laughter even when he was not speaking."

== Career ==
=== Gross National Product ===
Simmons developed and performed political comedy revues with GNP, including "A Bonzo Christmas Carol", which reached Off-Broadway. He also portrayed Ronald Reagan in "Rap Master Ronnie".

A 1994 Washington Post profile traced the troupe's development alongside Simmons work as a reporter for the Commerce Clearinghouse law journal in 1980. It documented GNP performances at D.C. Space by 1983, and appearances at New York cabarets, including the Improv, the Duplex and Caroline's Comedy Club.

Simmons worked in television in Los Angeles from 1985 to 1987 before returning to Washington for "Man Without a Contra". GNP's "BushCapades" began in 1988 and ran at the Bayou for four years, followed by "Clintoons". In 1991, the company's weekly "Bushcapades: An Administration on Thin Ice" featured an eight-person ensemble performing sketches, impersonations and improvisation.

Simmons directed GNP's 1992 production at Los Angeles's Odyssey Theatre. The Los Angeles Daily News selected the engagement as a comedy pick in "Weekend's Best". In April 1998, GNP presented "Sex, Lies & Zippergate" at San Francisco's Plush Room. San Francisco Chronicle critic Mick LaSalle praised the ensemble's versatility and energy in "Making Headlines Hilarious".

Simmons work with GNP combines political sketches, impersonations, musical parody and audience-inspired improvisation. He co-wrote "The Sound of Palin" with Christine Thompson and John Moody, presented in 2011 at Washington's Atlas Performing Arts Center. Roll Call described his revisions to the show in response to current political news.

In April 2025, GNP announced "Trump II: The Vengeance Tour", a political review scheduled to begin May 1 2025 at 'Don't Tell Mama' in Manhattan.

== Television ==
GNP produced The Unofficial Debates during the 1992 election. Its second television special, "The First 100 Daze", was an hour-long parody of the Clinton administration listed for broadcast on MPT on May 1, 1993. Excerpts from that special appeared in the BBC documentary "Presenting the President".

In January 1994, The Washington Post selected GNP's third television special, partly taped at Lisner Auditorium, for TV Week's "This Week's Picks". The article identified Simmons as an actor-producer who would portray Attorney General Janet Reno.GNP's fourth special, "Politics as Usual", was taped at Arena Stage's Old Vat Room and listed for broadcast on MPT in October 1994.

By 1998, five half-hour GNP specials had aired on KQED, including "Mock the Vote" before the 1996 presidential election.

== Scandal Tours ==
Scandal Tours brought political satire to Washington sightseeing, combining bus visits to locations associated with political scandals with costumed impersonations. Simmons performed on the tours; a 1989 New York Post feature identified as a GNP director-writer and described his portrayal of President George H.W. Bush. A December 1999 item in Life described the bus tours and portrayals of Richard Nixon, Fawn Hall, Donna Rice and Marilyn Quayle. The New York Post described a roughly 90-minute tour.

British coverage included George Gordon's November 1988 Daily Mail feature on the tours' use of scandal locations, actors and recorded sound, and Simon Hoggart's April 1989 Observer Magazine column reviewing the tour and its performers.
