= Anarchist law =

Legal theory within anarchist philosophy

Anarchist law is a term variously used to describe the apparent norms regarding behavior and decision-making operative within an anarchist community from the perspective of a law-normative viewpoint. Over the course of the last two hundred years as anarchism has grown and evolved to include diverse strains, there have been different conceptions of "anarchist law" produced and discussed, or used in practice.

Anarchism is opposed to reign, regarding authority as the claim to the exclusive exemption to morality, or law (ie, malum in se), otherwise, a monopoly on violence, (ie, Special Plea to ad baculum). Represented by a moral objection/s to the legal order, which is recognized as systematic, compulsory obedience to arbitrary, illogical and immoral rules, or malum prohibitum, decided by a body/ies (or sovereign/s) presiding over and with immunity against its subordinates and out-groups, thereby - necessarily - violating malum in se. Anarchists argue that the defining feature of violence is that it is a violation precisely by its initiation of aggression, disqualifying itself as self-defense.

According to anarchist scholar Shawn P. Wilbur first self-proclaimed anarchist Pierre-Joseph Proudhon saw necessity as the only law applicable to anarchistic relations. Shawn considers a consistently anarchic society to be alegal, meaning nothing is prohibited or permitted by the legal order.

== Consensus-based social contracts ==
Since the principle of anti-authority makes hierarchical structures unfeasible, anarchist communities must find an alternative basis for setting the rules of engagement within a collective. Accordingly, virtually all anarchist legal models begin with the assumption that whatever rules are set in place must be freely agreed to by the entirety of the community that is to be governed by them in a setting free from coercion or intimidation. Such freely given consent constitutes a social contract, though the exact nature of such contracts is a matter of heated debate.

Historian Robert Graham writes that central to Proudhon’s notion of contract is the idea of self-assumed obligation:

A person is only obligated to do that which he has freely undertaken to do. The only form of direct democracy compatible with this conception of obligation is one in which it is recognized that a minority which has refused to consent to a majority decision has assumed no obligation to abide by it. Majority decisions are not binding on the minority. Any agreement to the contrary would itself be invalid because it would require the minority to forfeit its autonomy and substantive freedom.

According to another prominent anarchist Peter Kropotkin anarchists desire society to be regulated by mutual agreements and social customs, not by laws or authorities:

The Anarchists conceive a society in which all the mutual relations of its members are regulated, not by laws, not by authorities, whether self-imposed or elected, but by mutual agreements between the members of that society, and by a sum of social customs and habits — not petrified by law, routine, or superstition, but continually developing and continually readjusted, in accordance with the ever-growing requirements of a free life, stimulated by the progress of science, invention, and the steady growth of higher ideals.

== Enforceability ==
Enforceability is one of the more controversial areas of anarchist law. Majority of anarchists, including prominent anarchist writers such as Proudhon, Mikhail Bakunin, Peter Kropotkin, William Godwin, Leo Tolstoy, Errico Malatesta and Josiah Warren argued against law enforcement.

== Free association ==
Free association (also called voluntary association) also implies the right of individuals to form those exact social contracts. This freedom to not associate means if the terms of a social contract become unacceptable to an individual member or sub-group(s) within a society, the discontented have the right to secede from the contract. They may also form new associations with others that more closely fit their needs.

== Non-coercion ==
Important maxim of many anarchist tendencies is that no individual has the right to coerce another individual, and that everyone has the right to defend themselves against coercion. Systems typically considered coercive include the state, capitalism, and institutional oppression. This basic principle, like mutual aid, is foundational to much of anarchist law, and indeed much of anarchist theory. Peter Kropotkin, a prominent anarcho-communist, stated it was "best summed up by the maxim 'do unto others as you would have them do unto you.'" In short, anarchist philosophy includes the "ethic of reciprocity," but typically condones violence intended to retaliate against or dismantle systems of oppression (with the exception of pacifist currents of anarchism)

== See also ==
- Voluntary association
- Polycentric law
