= Gross National Product (comedy group) =

American political satire comedy troupe

Comedy career
- Years active: 1980–Present
- Medium: theatre
- Genre: Satire
- Subjects: American politics, Washington, D.C., the U.S. federal government
- Members: over 25
- Website: GNPcomedy.com

Gross National Product (GNP) is an American political satire troupe founded by reporter and comedian John Simmons in Washington, D.C., in 1980. Its revues combine topical sketches, political impersonations, musical parody and audience improvisation. The troupe performed at the Bayou and Arena Stage, produced specials for public television, and staged sketches aboard Scandal Tours, a Washington bus tour that visited sites linked to political scandals. In 2011, Roll Call reported that GNP had performed in 45 states, with extended engagements in New York, Los Angeles, San Francisco and San Diego.

== History ==
=== Early Washington and New York productions ===
In 1980, John Simmons worked as a reporter in Washington while developing GNP as a political satire group.

The Video Buddies of GNP were the troupe’s early lineup. In a December 1980 Unicorn Times review of a show at Garvins in Washington, Wayne Cresser described sketches and physical comedy followed by a set in character as the Warsaw Pak, a fictional Polish new wave band. Its songs included “The Pope Is No Dope” and “We Don’t Wanna Dance the Polka.” Cresser called the music “ersatz rock from the Eastern Bloc” and described the ensemble as “Washington’s most original comedy ensemble.”

The Video Buddies of GNP opened for the Firesign Theatre at the University of Maryland’s Ritchie Coliseum in March 1981. In July 1982, the five-member ensemble presented a revue titled Gross National Product at Columbia Station’s cabaret in Washington. The Washington Post identified Simmons as its director and a principal writer.

Simmons co-wrote A Bonzo Christmas Carol with Joel Perry and directed it at New York’s Raft Theater. Reviewing the production in December 1982, Don Nelsen of the Daily News described how it interwove Ronald Reagan satire with Charles Dickens’s A Christmas Carol. By 1983, the troupe was appearing as Gross National Product at the Ballroom in Chelsea, where it performed political and corporate sketches that changed with the news.

An early outdoor GNP event covered in The Washington Post was a free pre-Independence Day show between the Watergate complex and the Potomac. Highlighted by Jeffrey Yorke in The Washington Post’s “Weekend’s Best” as “The Joy Boys,” the show featured “The Gipper” telling jokes, “James Watt” singing and “Wayne Newton” presiding as master of ceremonies. Spectators were encouraged to bring picnics, blankets—and their own Beach Boys music.

In Washington, GNP presented The Right Fluff and Terms of Endorsement at d.c. space. Reviewing the latter in 1984, Post critic Joe Brown singled out John Simmons’s Reagan impersonation and James Bowling’s performances, and praised the troupe’s parody of a dubbed Japanese horror film, Carp of Death. After working in television in Los Angeles from 1985 to 1987, Simmons returned to d.c. space in 1987 with Man Without a Contra, an Iran–Contra satire that combined scripted sketches and improvisation. In 1989, the company announced a production of Joe Orton’s The Erpingham Camp, described by the Post as its first straight play.

=== The Bayou and Arena Stage ===
GNP’s weekly Bayou revue BushCapades: An Administration on Thin Ice was announced in January 1989 as George H. W. Bush took office. An October 1991 New York Times travel feature described an eight-person ensemble performing sketches, impersonations and improvisation based on audience suggestions. In his August 3, 1990 review, Brown wrote: “In fact, as GNP grows ever more polished (and its teeth get sharper), it comes closer to becoming Washington’s answer to Chicago’s priceless Second City.” GNP appeared on the cover of The Washington Post’s Weekend section on February 7, 1992, under the headline “The Funny Business.” The accompanying article, “Comedy Tonight,” described GNP as “the longest-running and most successful sketch troupe in Washington.”

With the change in administrations, GNP replaced BushCapades with Clintoons, the First Hundred Daze. The revue took the form of a mock town meeting, with performers answering questions from the audience in character.

GNP later staged A Newt World Order at Arena Stage’s Old Vat Theater. Post critic Sarah Kaufman described how the company revised its sketches weekly. By March 1996, GNP was presenting On the Dole at the Old Vat while continuing A Newt World Order at the Bayou. The troupe also satirized the Clintons in the inaugural-weekend revue Hell to the Chief.

The 1994 edition of Fodor’s Washington, D.C. named GNP a “Fodor’s Choice” nightlife selection and described its performances at the Bayou. Rolling Stone also listed the troupe in its guide to comedy clubs. Eve Zibart’s The Unofficial Guide to Washington, D.C., 10th edition, includes GNP on pages 372–373 and Scandal Tours on page 140. GNP is also mentioned in the 1997 collection Minor Memos, compiled by Ronald G. Shafer.

=== California engagements ===
GNP opened Man Without a Contra at Hollywood’s Cast Theatre on July 31, 1987. Reviewing the production for Drama-Logue, Steven Zeller described the performers as changing “characters, looks, clothes, voices and personalities faster than Tammy Faye can cry.” Its Los Angeles productions also included The Phantom of the White House. Reviewing Phantom for L.A. Weekly, Maryl Jo Fox praised the impersonations and ensemble energy while finding that the pace sometimes obscured the material.

The troupe performed at Los Angeles’s Odyssey Theatre in 1992. Reviewing the production for the Los Angeles newspaper Daily News on May 19, 1992, Jody Leader gave it four stars, describing the satire as “relentless, articulate, drop-dead, biting”. During the 1996 Republican National Convention, it brought On the Dole to San Diego’s Theatre in Old Town, combining political impersonations with audience questions. The cast included Bob Heck as Bill Clinton, Christine Thompson as Hillary Clinton and Elizabeth Dole, and John Simmons as Bob Dole. Reviewing the show for The San Diego Union-Tribune, Michael Phillips praised the cast and concluded: “On the Dole deserves your vote.”

In April 1998, GNP brought Sex, Lies & Zippergate to San Francisco’s Plush Room. Mick LaSalle of the San Francisco Chronicle noted that it satirized both major parties.

In his June 24, 1998 review for the San Francisco Examiner, David Armstrong reported that the run had been extended through August and described a show combining scripted sketches with improvisation based on audience suggestions and current news. He singled out John Simmons and Christine Thompson as “Best of show” for their portrayal of Wayne and Ellen, a pair of motivational speakers delivering a get-rich pitch.

GNP returned to the Odyssey in 2000 with Gore More Years or Son of a Bush, a revue about the presidential contest between Al Gore and George W. Bush. The show included a mock convention in which the audience voted.

Reviewing the production in the August 15–21, 2000 issue of the entertainment trade publication The Hollywood Reporter, Ed Kaufman wrote that the group had “lost none of its bite and relentless edge.” He described the performance as “swift as lightning, clever and truly funny,” adding: “No one escapes the drop-dead, biting satire.”

=== Later productions ===
GNP’s weekly Son of a Bush resumed at Washington’s Naval Heritage Center on October 6, 2001, following a hiatus after the September 11 attacks.

After Don’t Tea on Me in 2010, GNP presented The Sound of Palin at the Atlas Performing Arts Center in January 2011. Written by Simmons, Christine Thompson and John Moody, the show followed Sarah Palin from the Wasilla mayor’s office to an imagined victory in the 2012 presidential election. Its parodies of songs from The Sound of Music included “How Do You Solve a Problem Like Sarah” and “Climbs Every Pollster,” sung by Simmons as Karl Rove. Roll Call reported that the troupe revised the material shortly before performances in response to current events.

== Scandal Tours ==
Launched in 1988, Scandal Tours combined Washington sightseeing with live impersonations and recorded sketches. GNP supplied the performers. An April 9, 1989 New York Post feature described Simmons portraying George H. W. Bush on the bus, alongside impersonations of Fawn Hall and Marilyn Monroe.

Stops included the Watergate complex, Gary Hart’s townhouse and the Tidal Basin. A package covered by Glamour paired the bus tour with a Ritz-Carlton reception and a GNP revue at d.c. space. International coverage included Simon Hoggart’s account in London’s The Observer, Staffan Heimerson’s column in Sweden’s Aftonbladet, a feature in Finland’s Ilta-Sanomat, and Paul Mansfield’s account in Britain’s The Daily Telegraph on February 7, 1998.

The tour was also featured in “Tourgate,” a December 1988 Life magazine item.

In 1992, The Washington Post described Scandal Tour In-a-Box, a 75-minute cassette adaptation packaged with a route map and souvenir paper shreddings. A 1996 Miami Herald travel feature described a later route that stopped at FBI headquarters, where a Janet Reno impersonator boarded.

The 1994 Fodor’s guide described Scandal Tours as a 90-minute bus trip featuring costumed GNP performers dramatizing political scandals, and also listed the 75-minute Scandal Tour In-a-Box cassette.

In a 2012 Watergate retrospective, Marc Fisher of The Washington Post reported that Watergate remained central to the tour. Simmons told Fisher that he still had passengers imitate Richard Nixon’s victory salute.

A November 1988 Washington Post photograph pictured Simmons as George Bush and Wes Johnson as Michael Dukakis alongside a Scandal Tours sign.

== Television and recorded work ==
GNP’s television specials aired on public television stations across the United States.

GNP produced The Unofficial Debates for the 1992 election and followed it with The First 100 Daze, a half-hour satire of the Clinton administration that aired on Maryland Public Television (MPT) in May 1993. Excerpts appeared in the BBC documentary Presenting the President.

The troupe’s third television special was listed among The Washington Post’s “This Week’s Picks” and scheduled for MPT on February 2, 1994, at 9:30 p.m. It included material taped at Lisner Auditorium, with Simmons portraying Attorney General Janet Reno. Its fourth, Politics as Usual, was taped at Arena Stage and scheduled for MPT that October. The Golden Rose of Montreux festival bulletin listed Gross National Product Comedy Special in its comedy section. GNP described the program as a finalist in a March 1994 announcement.

The 1996 election revue Mock the Vote was taped before an audience at Lisner Auditorium for public television. A Post television listing pictured Simmons as Bob Dole. By 1998, San Francisco’s KQED had aired five half-hour GNP specials, including Mock the Vote.

== Show titles and chronology ==
Year	Show title
1980	Video Buddies
1982	Gross National Product
1982	A Bonzo Christmas Carol
1983	1983 and Counting
1984	The Right Fluff
1984	Terms of Endorsement
1987	Man Without a Contra
1988	Phantom of the White House
By July 19, 1988	Ten Little Candidates
1989	BushCapades
1993	Clintoons
1994	A Newt World Order
1996	GNP: On the Dole
1997	Sex, Lies, and Zippergate
1999	Hell to the Chief
2000	Gore More Years or Son of a Bush
2001	Son of a Bush
2004	Kerry the Vote
2005	To Bush or Not to Bush
2006	Son of a Bush
2010	Don’t Tea on Me
2011	The Sound of Palin
2013	ScandalPedia
2018	Trumped!
2021	Biden Time
2025	Trump II: The Vengeance Tour

== GNP alumni, performers and writers ==
GNP’s performers have included Robin Abb, Kevin Brown, Ron Butler, Doug Cox, Larry Coven, Marianne Curan, Sarah Delea, Brad Dismukes, Liz Demery, David Doyle, John Dryden, Shari Elliker, Margaret Emory, Dion Flynn, Elliott Forrest, Bob Garman, Tim Gore, Scott Hartman, Robert W. Heck, Ed Henley, Dave Johnson, Wes Johnson, Scott Keck, Bill Lobley, Richard “Scrumbly” Koldewyn, Chuck Kovacic, CiCi Stephens, Bill Largess, John Moody, John Hardison, Emlyn Morinelli McFarland, Terri Madden, Tim Mollen, Nick Olcott, Joel Perry, Christopher Pray, Tim Rankin, Melissa Rauch, John Roarke, Christopher Russel, Kara Russel, Stephen Schmidt, John Simmons, Victor Steele, Vanessa Stout, Christine Thompson, Bruce Tobin, Helen VanHook, Erica Van Wagener, Pam Woodruff, Eddie Yarrow, Wendy Yondorf and Amy Ziff.

Bill Oakley and Josh Weinstein wrote sketches for GNP before their television careers. A 1990 Washington Times feature profiled Simmons and Ed Henley’s presidential impersonations, including Henley’s roles on Scandal Tours. The writing credits for the 2000 Odyssey production included Simmons, Joel Perry, Doug Cox, John Moody, Christine Thompson and Christopher Pray.

Playbill reported that Melissa Rauch toured with GNP and appeared in its 2004 productions of Son of a Bush and Kerry the Vote.
