= John Symonds (disambiguation) =

John Symonds was an English writer.

John Symonds may also refer to:

- John Symonds (academic) (1730–1807), professor of modern history at the University of Cambridge
- John Symonds (surveyor) (1813–1852), British Army officer and surveyor
- John Addington Symonds (physician) (1807–1871), British author
- John Addington Symonds (1840–1893), British poet and literary critic, son of the physician
- John Alexander Symonds (1935–2017), British KGB agent
- John Jermyn Symonds (1816–1883), New Zealand politician in the 19th century

== See also ==
- John Simmonds (disambiguation)
- John Simonds (disambiguation)
