= John Molyneux (Trotskyist) =

British Trotskyist, academic, and author (1948–2022)

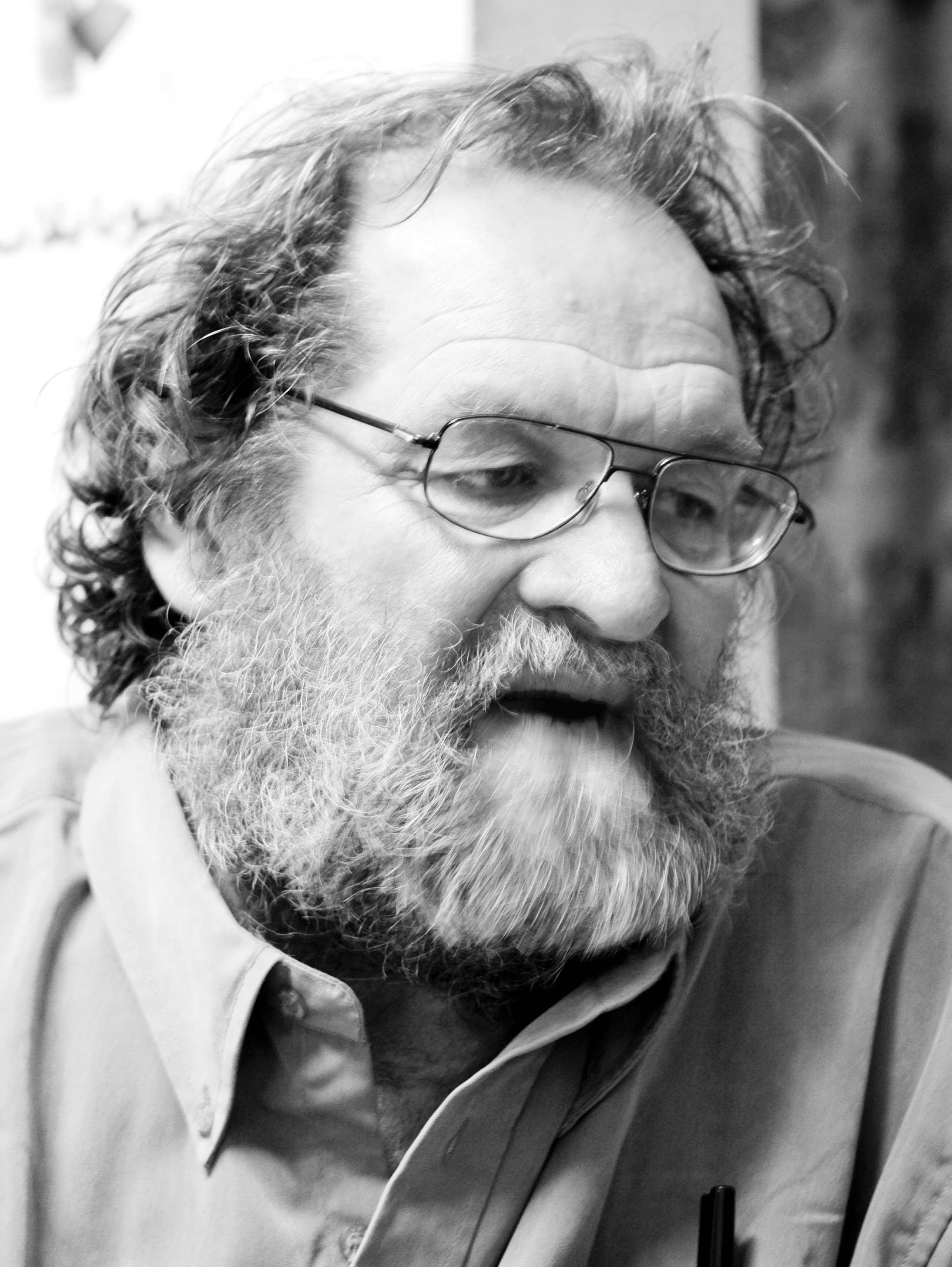
- Molyneux in 2009
- Born: 2 September 1948
- Died: 10 December 2022 (aged 74); Dublin, Ireland
- Occupations: Academic, writer

John Molyneux (2 September 1948 – 10 December 2022) was a British Trotskyist, academic and author. He was a leading member of the Socialist Workers Party before retiring to Ireland, where he became active in the Irish SWP and was editor of Irish Marxist Review.

== Biography ==
Molyneux was born on 2 September 1948.

Molyneux joined the International Socialists in Britain in 1968 after being radicalized by the antiwar movement and the revolt of that year. He became one of the Socialist Worker's Party's leading theorists. He was a lecturer at the School of Art, Design and Media, University of Portsmouth, from 1992. During his years in Portsmouth he was a significant influence in the city left. He organised a number of demonstrations, including getting 12 coaches of people to the 2003 demonstration against the Iraq War, in London. In January 2009 he was arrested for organising a peace rally of 400 people against the Israeli attacks on Gaza.

His book Marxism and the Party (1978), analyzes the revolutionary left approach to the political party and the question of the revolutionary organisation and the discussion of Marx, Luxemburg, Lenin, Trotsky, and Gramsci. In 1981 he authored Leon Trotsky's Theory of Revolution (1981), which critically explored Trotsky's weaknesses and his strengths. What is the Real Marxist Tradition? (1983/85) started life as a long article and was later published as a short book and is perhaps his most widely read publication.

He wrote a weekly column, The ABCs of Marxism, published in Socialist Worker (UK) for almost 15 years some of which were collected into a book Arguments for Revolutionary Socialism (1987) and a pamphlet on The Future Socialist Society (1987).

After he moved to Ireland he edited the Irish Marxist Review and contributed to many issues.

In 2006, he set up a blog where he "writes mainly about Marxist theory and art".

His book The Point Is to Change It! was included in a display at the Tate Liverpool's exhibition Art turning Left (2013) showing the role that art plays in changing society.

In October 2020, he hosted the podcast Introduction to Marx/Marxism, which he described as "a series of short introductions to the ideas of Marx/Marxism".

In his last years Molyneux also became involved in building an eco-socialist response to the climate crisis. He was one of the founders of the Global Ecosocialist Network.

He once wrote an article in the SWP's Internal Bulletin called "Democracy in the SWP", which argued that, though the SWP is democratic, it needs to be more so, prompting the Weekly Worker, the organ of the Communist Party of Great Britain (Provisional Central Committee) to call him a "loyal rebel".

Molyneux remained a member of the loyal opposition in the SWP staying with the organisation in 2012-13 when the SWP faced a major crisis in then wake of an accusation of rape against a leading member.

Molyneux died suddenly in Dublin on 10 December 2022, at the age of 74.

== Bibliography ==
- Marxism and the Party (1978) – ISBN 0-906224-28-4
- Leon Trotsky's theory of revolution (1981)
- What is the real Marxist tradition? (1985)
- Arguments for Revolutionary Socialism (1987)
- 'National Oppression and National Liberation Movements'
- The Future Socialist Society (1997) – ISBN 0-905998-60-X
- Rembrandt and Revolution (2001) – ISBN 1-872208-15-0
- Terrorism
- The necessity of Respect (2004)
- Anarchism: A Marxist Criticism (2011) – ISBN 978-1-905192-88-5
- Will the Revolution be Televised? A Marxist Analysis of the Media (2011) – ISBN 978-1-905192-91-5
- The Point is to Change It! An Introduction to Marxist Philosophy (2012)
- Lenin for Today (2017)
- What is ecosocialism? (2020) (with Jess Spear).
- The Dialectics of Art (2020)
- Selected Writings on Socialism and Revolution (2022) – ISBN 9781914143465
- Why we stand against Stalinism (2022)
