= A. John Simmons =

American political philosopher

Alan John Simmons
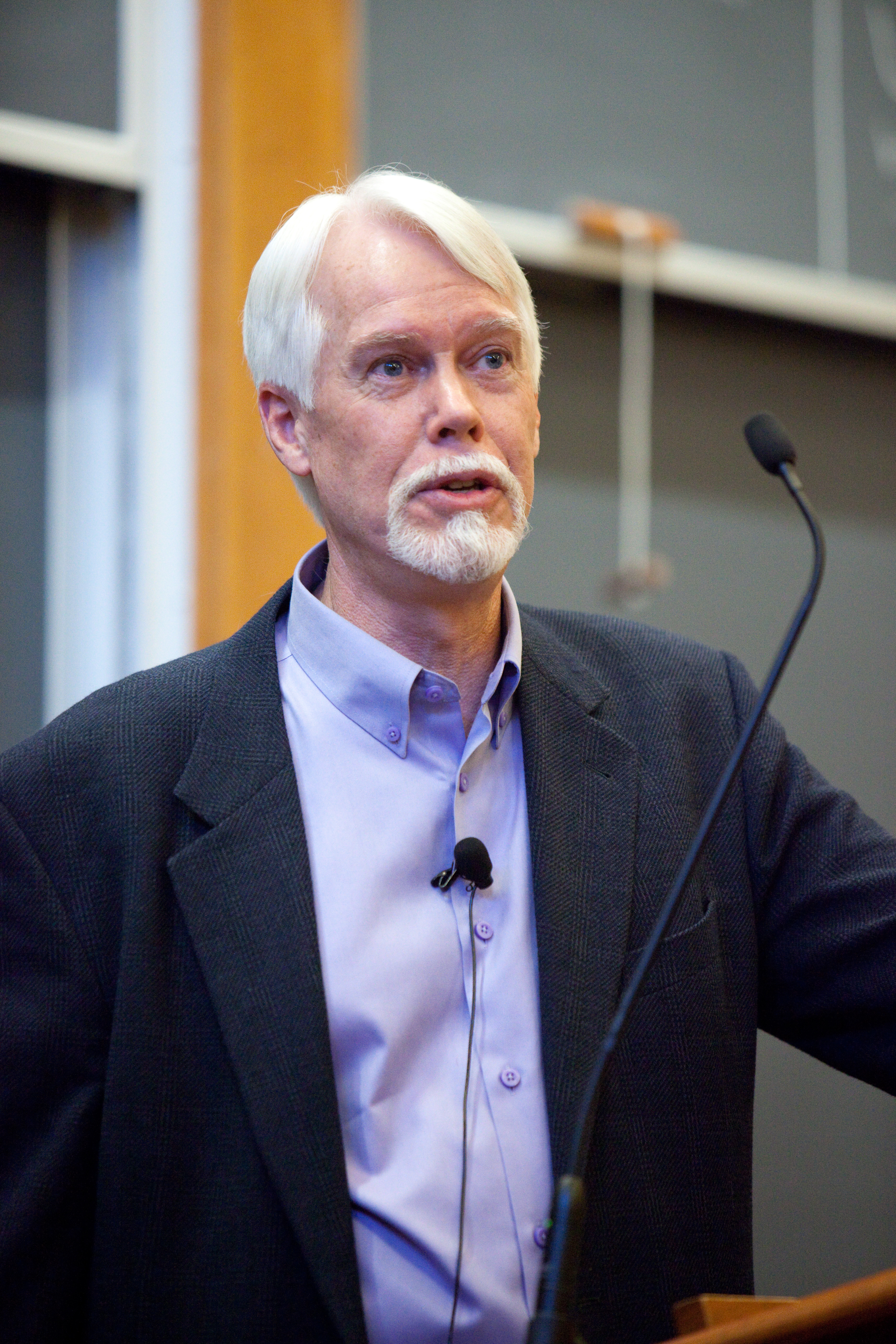
- Born: May 4, 1950 (age 76)

Education
- Education: Princeton University

Philosophical work
- Notable works: Moral Principles and Political Obligations (1979)

Alan John Simmons (born May 4, 1950) is an American political philosopher.

Simmons graduated from Princeton University and completed a master's degree and doctorate from Cornell University. He began teaching at the University of Virginia in 1976, where he was later named Commonwealth Professor of Philosophy, John Allen Hollingsworth Professor of Philosophy, and Professor of Law. Simmons has chaired Virginia's Philosophy Department and its Program in Political and Social Thought, and he received Virginia's All-University Teaching Award in that award's inaugural year. He taught Ethics as a special Consultant for six years at the FBI National Academy and has lectured widely (including the 2013 Auguste Comte Lectures at the London School of Economics). Simmons has served on the editorial staff of Philosophy & Public Affairs since 1982. He is the author of many books on Lockean theory. He is best known for his work on political obligation, legitimacy and authority, John Locke's moral and political philosophy, ideal and nonideal theory (in moral and political philosophy), and the territorial rights of states. Simmons' 1979 book, Moral Principles and Political Obligations, served as the new starting point for almost all subsequent philosophical discussions of the problem of political obligation.

== Publications ==
- Moral Principles and Political Obligations (Princeton, 1979)
- International Ethics, editor (Princeton, 1985)
- The Lockean Theory of Rights (Princeton, 1992)
- On the Edge of Anarchy: Locke, Consent, and the Limits of Society (Princeton, 1993)
- Punishment, editor (Princeton, 1995)
- Justification and Legitimacy: Essays on Rights and Obligations (Cambridge, 2000)
- Is There a Duty to Obey the Law? For and Against (with C.H. Wellman) (Cambridge, 2005)
- Political Philosophy (Oxford, 2008)
- Boundaries of Authority (Oxford, 2016)
- Locke, Second Treatise of Government, editor (Norton, 2021)
