= Authority =

Legitimate power to decide or authorize

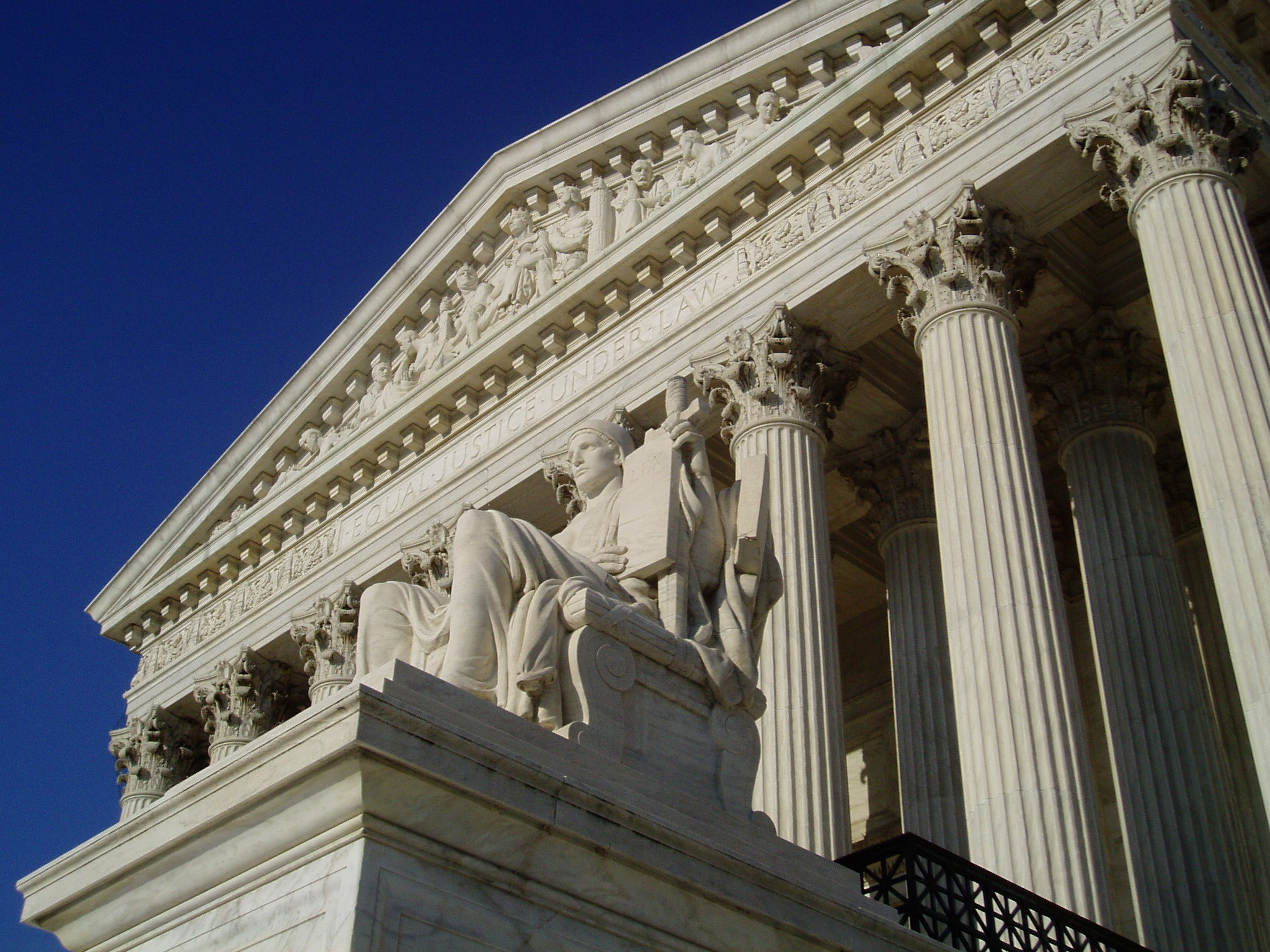
The Supreme Court of the United States is the highest judicial authority in the country

Authority is commonly understood as the legitimate power of a person or group over other people. In a civil state, authority may be practiced by legislative, executive, and judicial branches of government, each of which has authority and is an authority. The term "authority" has multiple nuances and distinctions within various academic fields ranging from sociology to political science, including religious studies.

The term authority identifies the political legitimacy, which grants and justifies rulers' right to exercise the power of government; and the term power identifies the ability to accomplish an authorized goal, either by compliance or by obedience; hence, authority is the power to make decisions and the legitimacy to make such legal decisions and order their execution.

== History ==
Ancient western understandings of authority trace back to Rome and draw later from Catholic (Thomistic) thought and other traditional understandings. In more modern terms, forms of authority include transitional authority (exhibited in, for example, Cambodia), public authority in the form of popular power, and, in more administrative terms, bureaucratic or managerial techniques. In terms of bureaucratic governance, one limitation of the governmental agents of the executive branch, as outlined by George A. Krause, is that they are not as close to the popular will as elected representatives are. The claims of authority can extend to national or individual sovereignty, which is broadly or provisionally understood as a claim to political authority that is legitimated.

Historical applications of authority in political terms include the formation of the city-state of Geneva, and experimental treatises involving the topic of authority in relation to education include Emile, or On Education by Jean-Jacques Rousseau. As David Laitin defines, authority is a key concept to be defined in determining the range and role of political theory, science and inquiry.

== Political philosophy ==
There have been several contributions to the debate of political authority. Among others, Hannah Arendt, Carl Joachim Friedrich, Thomas Hobbes, Alexandre Kojève and Carl Schmitt have provided some of the most influential texts.

In European political philosophy, the jurisdiction of political authority, the location of sovereignty, the balancing of notions of freedom and authority, and the requirements of political obligations have been core questions from the time of Plato and Aristotle to the present. Most democratic societies are engaged in an ongoing discussion regarding the legitimate extent of the exercise of governmental authority. In the United States, for instance, there is a prevailing belief that the political system as instituted by the Founding Fathers should accord the populace as much freedom as reasonable; that government should limit its authority accordingly, known as limited government.

Political anarchism is a philosophy which rejects the legitimacy of political authority and adherence to any form of sovereign rule or autonomy of a nation-state. An argument for political anarchy is made by Michael Huemer in his book The Problem of Political Authority. On the other side, one of the main arguments for the legitimacy of the state is some form of the social contract theory developed by Thomas Hobbes in his 1668 book, Leviathan, or by Jean-Jacques Rousseau in his political writings on the social contract.

== Sociology ==
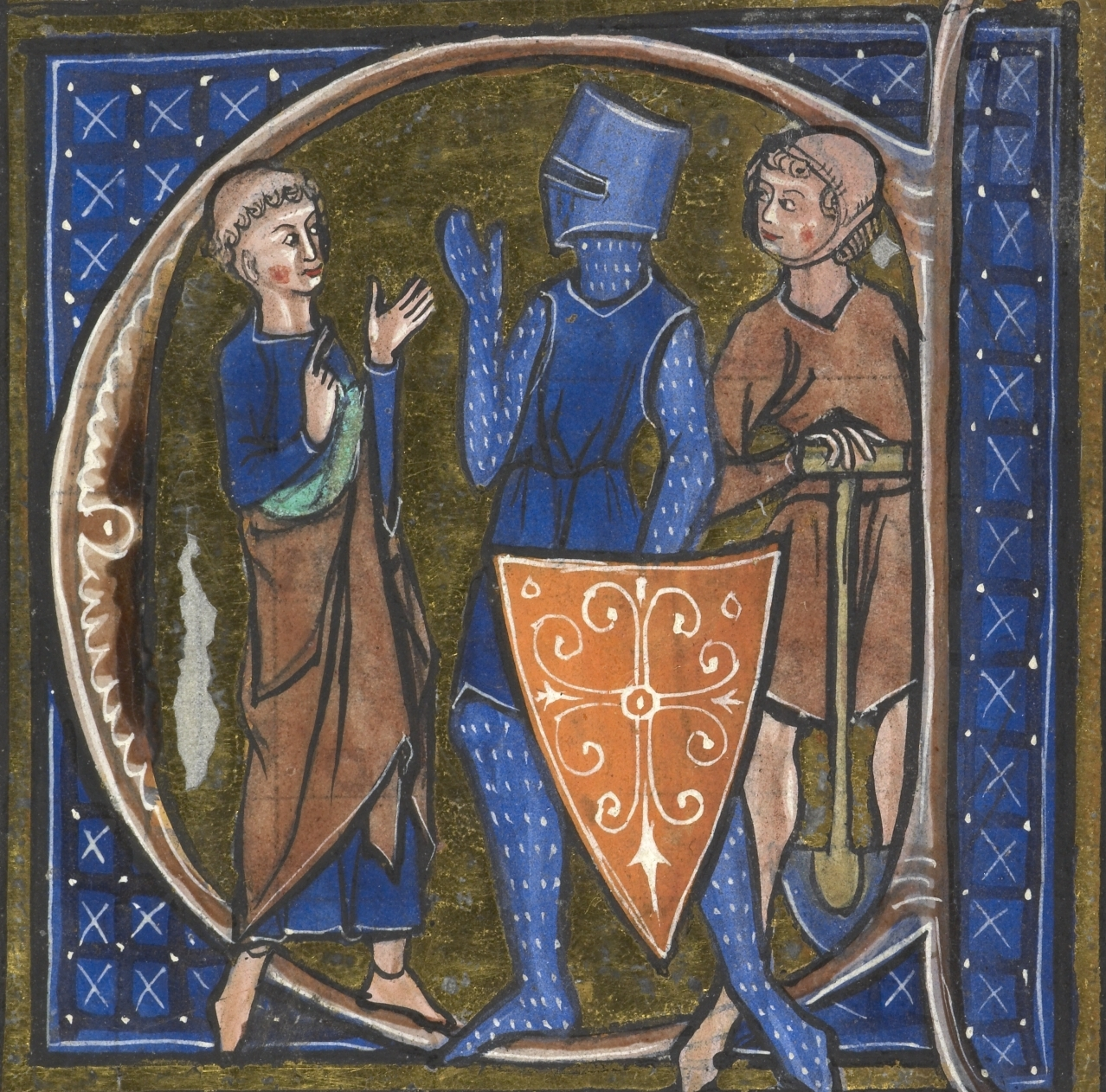
An inhabited initial from a 13th-century French text representing the tripartite social order of the Middle Ages: the ōrātōrēs (those who pray – clerics), bellātōrēs (those who fight – knights, that is, the nobility), and labōrātōrēs (those who work – peasants and members of the lower middle class).

In sociology, authority is the legitimate or socially approved power which one person or a group possesses and practices over another. The element of legitimacy is vital to the notion of authority and is the main means by which authority is distinguished from the more general concept of power and dominant group, including dominant minority and dominant majority.

Power can be exerted by the use of force or violence. Authority, by contrast, depends on the acceptance by subordinates of the right of those above them to give them orders or directives. It only exists to the extent that it is recognized. As Andreas Dorschel put it: "Authority may in fact go unquestioned, even for a long period of time, but it is never beyond questioning because whosoever grants can also withhold."

The definition of authority in contemporary social science remains a matter of debate. Max Weber in his essay "Politics as a Vocation" (1919) divided legitimate authority into three types. Others, like Howard Bloom, suggest a parallel between authority and respect/reverence for ancestors.

=== Max Weber on authority ===
Max Weber defined domination (authority) as the chance of commands being obeyed by a specifiable group of people. Legitimate authority is that which is recognized as legitimate and justified by both the ruler and the ruled. Legitimated rule results in what Weber called the monopoly over the use of coercive violence in a given territory. The concept of authority has also been discussed as a guiding principle in human-machine interaction design.

Genetic research indicates that obedience to authority may be a heritable factor.

=== Children and authority attributes ===
Authority and its attributes have been identified as particularly relevant to children as they regard their parents and teachers. The three attributes of authority have been described as status, specialist skills or knowledge, and social position. Children consider the type of command, the characteristics of the authority figure, and the social context when making authority conclusions.

Although children regard these three types of authority attributes, they first assess the legitimacy of the authority figure in question using the nature of the commands they give. For example, a teacher who does not appear to have legitimate power from the child's perspective (perhaps because she or he cannot control the class well) will not be obeyed. Regarding parenting, authoritative parents who are warm and high in behavioral control but low in psychological control are more likely to be seen as having legitimate authority over the child, and children will believe that they have a duty to obey them and internalize their values. While the study of children in modern capitalist societies does look at the psychological aspects of children's understanding of legitimate authority at the level of symbolic interaction it is also true that is an extrapolated assumption based on one interpretation of a broad Comparative Historical Sociological (CHS) analysis of legitimate authority in multiple societies over a long duration, rather than a micro-social psychological study of children per se. There is nothing in Weber's published work in the Max Weber Gesamtausgabe that directly deals with children's perceptions in "formations" with traditional legitimate authority, prior to the emergence of modern capitalism .

== Religious studies ==
Religious authority refers to the organizational control and decision-making power within a social system. It operates through three forms: authoritative objects (e.g. sacred texts), religious figures or social positions (e.g. clergy, institutional leaders), and absent authority figures (e.g. gods). The authority can be understood as a kind of projection, reflecting individuals' own ideas through processes such as selective privileging, and it is maintained through social recognition, particularly the acceptance of decisions made by clergy or religious leaders.

=== Operation of religious authority ===
Religious authority operates through social processes, including creation, maintenance, and transformation. It is established to improve social coordination through shared rituals and organizational social expectation. Then, it is maintained by religious institutions' structures, recognized roles, sacred texts, and relevant ideas, which strengthens authority by communication (online/offline). At the same time, religious authority can be changed. Especially, in modern society, the increase in the use of new media has an impact on the decentralization of authority, challenging traditional sources of religious authority.

== See also ==
- Anti-authoritarianism
- Appeal to authority
- Auctoritas
- Authoritarianism
- Authority (management)
- Authority bias
- Legitimacy
- List of sociology topics
- Milgram experiment (sociological experiments measuring obedience to authority figures)
- Patrimonialism
- Petty authority
- Power distance
- Question authority
- Soft power
