= Ethical Intuitionism (book) =

2005 book by Michael Huemer

- Author: Michael Huemer
- Language: English
- Subject: Ethical intuitionism
- Genre: Philosophy
- Published: 2005
- Publisher: Palgrave Macmillan
- Publication place: United States
- Media type: Print
- Pages: 334 (hardcover)
- ISBN: 978-1403989680

Ethical Intuitionism is a 2005 book (hardcover release: 2005, paperback release: 2008) by University of Colorado philosophy professor Michael Huemer, defending ethical intuitionism. The book expands on Huemer's early writing defending moral realism.

== Reception ==
=== Reviews in academic publications ===
The book was reviewed by David McNaughton of Florida State University in Notre Dame Philosophical Reviews. The review was generally positive and concluded thus: "This book has many merits. It is generally clear, well-argued, timely, and thought-provoking. Not the least of its merits, however, is that it contains a large element of truth. Huemer is understandably frustrated that so many people still misrepresent intuitionism and fail to take it seriously. But it is making a return, and currently has more proponents than he sometimes seems to suggest. His book should help create some more." However, McNaughton's review was critical of Huemer's phenomenal conservatism and suggested that doxastic conservatism would have been more convincing.

Mark Schroeder of the University of Southern California reviewed the book in Philosophy and Phenomenological Research. Schroder defended his metaethical perspective, reductive realism, against Huemer's criticisms, noting that one could be a realist while rejecting the dualist metaphysics that underpinned Huemer's analysis.

The book was also reviewed by Noah Lemos in Mind, a journal published by Oxford University Press, in April 2008.
