= Philosophical anarchism =

Anarchist school of thought

Philosophical anarchism is an anarchist school of thought which focuses on intellectual criticism of authority, especially political power, and the legitimacy of governments. The American anarchist and socialist Benjamin Tucker coined the term philosophical anarchism to distinguish peaceful evolutionary anarchism from revolutionary variants. Although philosophical anarchism does not necessarily imply any action or desire for the elimination of authority, philosophical anarchists do not believe that they have an obligation or duty to obey any authority or conversely that the state or any individual has a right to command. Philosophical anarchism is a component especially of individualist anarchism.

== Overview ==
=== Types and variations ===
As conceived by William Godwin, philosophical anarchism requires individuals to act in accordance with their own judgments and to allow every other individual the same liberty. Conceived as egoistically by Max Stirner, it implies that the unique one who truly owns himself recognizes no duties to others. Within the limit of his might, he does what is right for him.

Rather than taking up arms to bring down the state, philosophical anarchists "have worked for a gradual change to free the individual from what they thought were the oppressive laws and social constraints of the modern state and allow all individuals to become self-determining and value-creating." Those anarchists may oppose the immediate elimination of the state by violent means out of concern that what remains might be vulnerable to the establishment of a yet more harmful and oppressive state. That is especially true among those anarchists who consider violence and the state as synonymous or that it is counterproductive if public reaction to violence results in increased "law enforcement" efforts.

=== Political and philosophical anarchism ===
Magda Egoumenides writes, "The anarchist criticisms and ideal of legitimacy explain the link between philosophical and political anarchism: they remind us that the enduring deficiency of the state is a position that is initially shared by both forms of anarchism, and the moral criteria of philosophical anarchism are intended to be inherent in the society that political anarchism seeks to create." According to Egoumenides, "A demonstration of the compatibility of political anarchist social visions with the perspective and ideals of legitimacy of critical philosophical anarchism establishes a continuity within the anarchist ideology."

Michael Huemer writes, "In the terminology of contemporary political philosophy, I have so far defended philosophical anarchism (the view that there are no political obligations), but I have yet to defend political anarchism (the view that government should be abolished)." He argues that "the terminology is misleading" since "both kinds of 'anarchism' are philosophical and political claims."

== Criticism ==
Philosophical anarchism has met the criticism of members of academia following the release of pro-anarchist books such as A. John Simmons' Moral Principles and Political Obligations (1979). In The Problem of Political Authority: An Examination of the Right to Coerce and the Duty to Obey (2013), Michael Huemer defends his interpretation of philosophical anarchism and claims that "political authority is a moral illusion".

The law professor William A. Edmundson authored an essay arguing against three major philosophical anarchist principles that he finds fallacious. Edmundson claims that the individual does not owe a normal state a duty of obedience, but he considers that not to imply that anarchism is the inevitable conclusion and the state is still morally legitimate.

Another criticism of philosophical anarchism is that it remains purely theoretical. In failing to act out anarchism in the real world, philosophical anarchism is seen as a bourgeois convenience that actually serves the status quo, rather than destroying it.

== Bibliography ==
- Dagger, Richard (2000). "Philosophical Anarchism and Its Fallacies: A Review Essay". Law and Philosophy. 19 (3): 391–406. doi:10.1023/A:1006454713349. JSTOR 3505181.
- Dowling, Robert M. (2007). "On Eugene O'Neill's 'Philosophical Anarchism'". The Eugene O'Neill Review. 29: 50–72. doi:10.2307/29784831. JSTOR 29784831.
- Fiala, Andrew (2021) [2017]. "Anarchism". Stanford Encyclopedia of Philosophy. ISSN 1095-5054.
- Gans, Chaim (1992). Philosophical anarchism and political disobedience. Cambridge University Press. ISBN 0-521-41450-4.
- Jun, Nathan J. (2016). "On Philosophical Anarchism". Radical Philosophy Review. 19 (3): 551–567. doi:10.5840/radphilrev201521928. ISSN 1388-4441.
- Martin, Rex (1974). "Wolff's Defence of Philosophical Anarchism". The Philosophical Quarterly. 24 (95): 140–149. doi:10.2307/2217718. ISSN 0031-8094. JSTOR 2217718.
- McLaughlin, Paul (2010). "In Defence of Philosophical Anarchism". In Franks, Benjamin; Wilson, Matthew (eds.). Anarchism and Moral Philosophy. Palgrave Macmillan. pp. 13–32. doi:10.1057/9780230289680_2. ISBN 9780230289680.
- Simmons, Alan (2009). "Philosophical Anarchism". Social Science Research Network. doi:10.2139/ssrn.1344425.
- Szűcs, Zoltán Gábor (2022). "On the edge of anarchism: a realist critique of philosophical anarchism". Critical Review of International Social and Political Philosophy. 27 (7): 1180–1203. doi:10.1080/13698230.2022.2040201. ISSN 1369-8230.
- Weiss, Thomas G. (1975). "The Tradition of Philosophical Anarchism and Future Directions in World Policy". Journal of Peace Research. 12 (1): 1–17. doi:10.1177/002234337501200101. ISSN 0022-3433.
