= Narendra Biyogi =

Nepalese song writer (born 1986)

Narendra Biyogi नरेन्द्र वियोगी
- Born: September 9, 1986 (age 39); Pyuthan district, Nepal
- Origin: Nepal
- Genres: Folk music
- Occupation: Musician $ music arranger
- Years active: 2003–present

Narendra Biyogi (Nepali:नरेन्द्र वियोगी, born September 9, 1986) is a songwriter, musician, and music arranger from the Pyuthan district of Nepal. Biyogi is best known for the arrangement of Parkha Parkha Mayalu and Pirim Nalaune.

== Biography ==
Narendra Biyogi began his musical career in 2014 with Timro Khushi Mero Khushi by Sworoopraj Acharya. He has been involved with various genres such as Nepali folk music, modern tunes, and pop music. Some of his notable songs are Parak Parak Mayalu, Pirim Nalaune, Junko Saathi Taara and Rewan Chasmaa.

== Awards ==
SN	Award Title	Category	Notable Work	Citation
1	Genius Music Award	Best Arranger Juri Award	Song -Pirim Nalaune -2019	
2	Nim Awards - 2023	Best Music Arranger	Lai lai Rajkumari	
3	3rd Natyashwor Music Award	Best Music Arranger (Folk Song)	Ustai Luga	
4	Chhya Chhabi Music Awards	Best Music Arrabger (Teej Song)	Kharcha Magdina	

== Discography ==
=== General songs ===
SN	Song name	Credit	Singer	ref
1	Pirim Nalaune	Arranger	Aashish Gautam / Melina Rai	
2	Balakhaima Dil Basayo Gauthali	Music	Rupesh Chand	
3	Junko Sathi Tara (Doli)	Arranger	HIMAL SHRESTHA | TRISHALA GURUNG	
4	Rayban Chasma(Rahul Shah)	ARRANGE/ MIX/MASTERING	BHIM BISTA SEERISH/ANJILA REGMI	
5	Dhiki Chyau (Okal Dokal-2)	Arrange / Mixing	Sahima Shrestha / Sandip Neupane	
6	Ghar Bar	Music	Krishna Karki / Bindu Paryiyar	
7	Arko Juni Khai Kunni	Arranger	Hari Bansa Acharya	
8	Timro Maya Kati din Lai	Arranger	Sangita Raimajhi	
9	Paryo maya Jalai ma	Arranger	Shambhujit Baskota	
10	Ghiti Ghiti	Arranger	Promod Kharel	
11	Lailai Barai	Group Vocals	Nanda Panta	
12	Dharti	Music		

=== Movie songs ===
SN	Song name	Credit	Singer	Movie name	ref
1	Parkha Parkha	Arranger	Krishna Kafle / Bindu Pariyar	Mangalam	
2	Raifalko Sirani	Arranger	Dhurba Bisco/Shahima Shrestha	Kale dai	
