= Emily McTernan =

British political philosopher

Emily McTernan is a British political philosopher who is an associate professor of political philosophy at University College London.

== Career ==
McTernan studied at King's College, University of Cambridge, reading for BA in philosophy at from 2005 to 2008 and a MPhil in history, philosophy, and sociology of science, technology, and medicine from 2008 to 2009. She read for a PhD from 2009 to 2013. Her thesis was called Equality and Responsibility. From 2012 to 2013, she was an LSE Fellow at the London School of Economics. She took up a lectureship at University College London in 2013, and was promoted to associate professor in 2019.

In 2021, she was awarded the Britain and Ireland Association for Political Thought early-career prize. Her book On Taking Offence was published in 2023 by Oxford University Press, and was the subject of a symposium in the Critical Review of International Social and Political Philosophy. In the book, McTernan defends feelings of offence, arguing that they can be both morally appropriate and socially valuable.

== Selected publications ==
=== Books ===
- McTernan, Emily (2023). On Taking Offence. Oxford University Press.

=== Articles ===
- McTernan, Emily (2014). "How to Make Citizens Behave: Social Psychology, Liberal Virtues, and Social Norms". Journal of Political Philosophy. 22 (1): 84–104. doi:10.1111/jopp.12015.
- McTernan, Emily (2015). "Should Fertility Treatment be State Funded?". Journal of Applied Philosophy. 32 (3): 227–40. doi:10.1111/japp.12091.
- McTernan, Emily (2018). "Microaggressions, Equality, and Social Practices". Journal of Political Philosophy. 26 (3): 261–81. doi:10.1111/jopp.12150.
