= USC School of Philosophy =

Division of University of Southern California

School of Philosophy
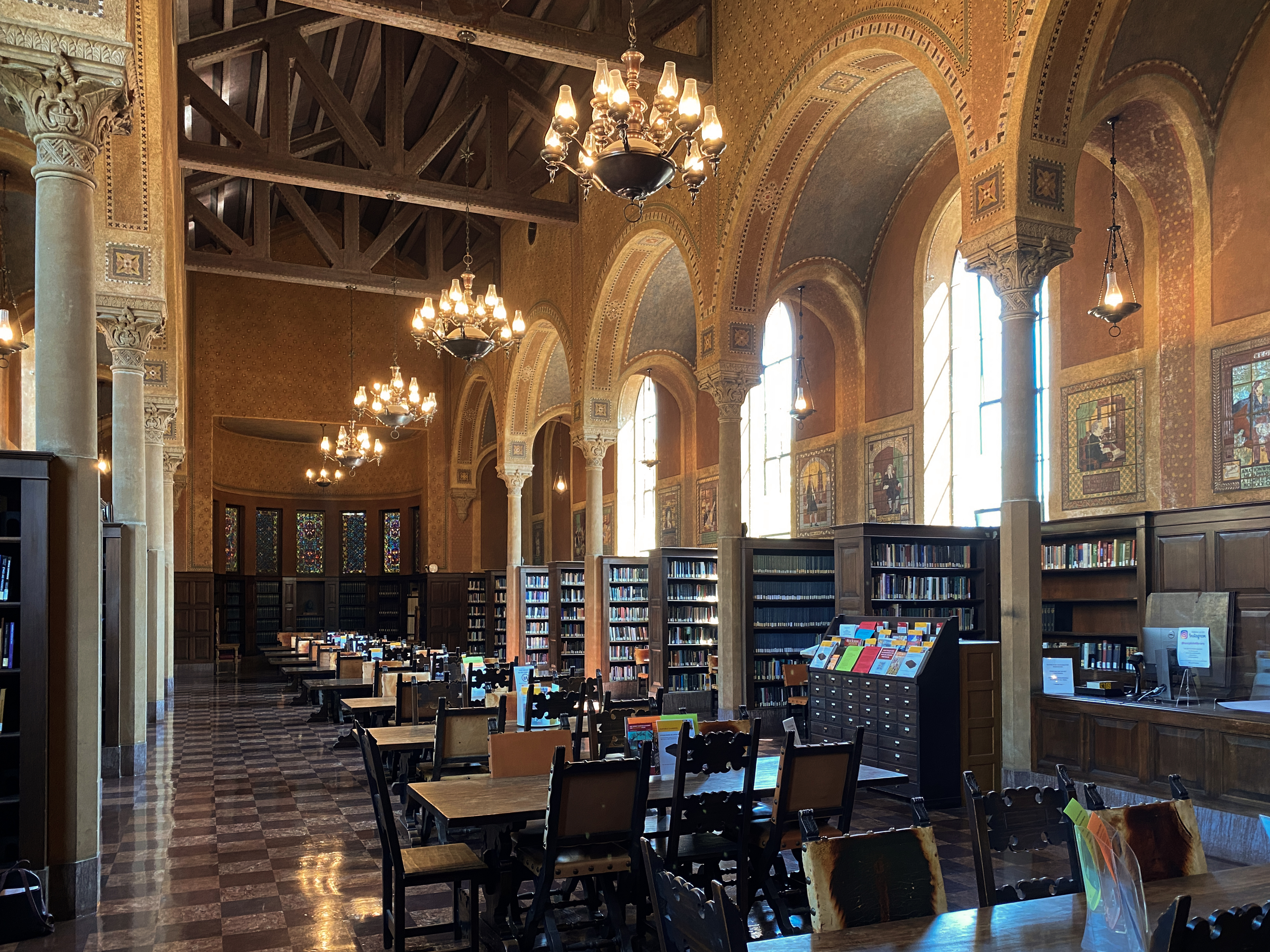
- Parent institution: Dana and David Dornsife College of Letters, Arts, and Sciences
- Head of School: Scott Soames
- Website: dornsife.usc.edu/phil/

The School of Philosophy is a department-level school within the Dornsife College of Letters, Arts, and Sciences at the University of Southern California.

== Rankings ==
The Philosophical Gourmet Report lists the school at 7th in the US and 8th in the English-speaking world.

== Faculty ==
This list is limited to those with articles in Wikipedia

- Antonio Damasio, David Dornsife Chair in Neuroscience and Professor of Psychology, Philosophy, and Neurology
- John Hawthorne, Professor of Philosophy
- Gregory Keating, William T. Dalessi Professor of Law and Professor of Philosophy
- Sharon Lloyd, Professor of Philosophy, Law, and Political Science
- Mark Schroeder, Professor of Philosophy
- Scott Soames, Distinguished Professor of Philosophy
- Jacob Soll, Professor of philosophy, history and accounting
- Gary Watson, Provost Professor of Philosophy and Law

== Emeritus faculty ==
- S. Marshall Cohen, University Professor Emeritus and Professor Emeritus of Philosophy and Law
- Frank Lewis, Professor Emeritus of Philosophy
- George Wilson, Professor Emeritus of Philosophy

== Former faculty ==
- John Hospers
- James Higginbotham

== See also ==
- NYU Department of Philosophy
