= Mark E. Warren =

American philosopher

- Awards: Spitz Prize

Education
- Education: Lewis and Clark College (BA); University of Toronto (PhD)

Philosophical work
- Era: 21st-century philosophy
- Region: Western philosophy
- Institutions: University of British Columbia, Northwestern University, Rice University

Mark E. Warren is an American political philosopher and Harold and Dorrie Merilees Chair in the Study of Democracy at the University of British Columbia. He is known for his works on political theory. Warren is a winner of the David and Elaine Spitz Prize for his book Democracy and Association.

== Books ==
- The Oxford Handbook of Deliberative Democracy. Edited with Andre Bachtiger, John Dryzek, and Jane Mansbridge. Oxford University Press. 2018.
- Designing Deliberative Democracy: The BC Citizens’ Assembly. Edited with Hilary Pearse. 2008. Cambridge University Press.
- Democracy and Association. Princeton: Princeton University Press, 2001.
- Democracy and Trust. Edited, with introduction, one chapter, and conclusion. Cambridge: Cambridge University Press, 1999.
- Nietzsche and Political Thought. Cambridge, MA: MIT Press, 1988.
