= Teresa Bejan =

American political theorist and author

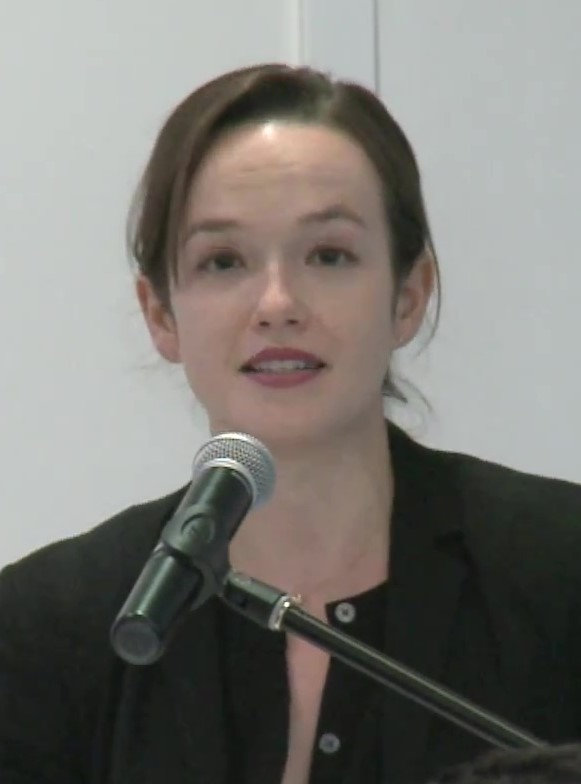
- Born: March 30, 1984 (age 42)
- Awards: BIAPT Early Career Prize (2020), Philip Leverhulme Prize (2021)

Education
- Education: University of Chicago (BA); University of Cambridge (MPhil); Yale University (PhD)

Philosophical work
- Era: 21st-century philosophy
- Region: Western philosophy
- School: Political philosophy
- Institutions: University of Oxford
- Main interests: political theory, toleration, egalitarianism, civil discourse
- Website: https://www.politics.ox.ac.uk/person/teresa-bejan

Teresa M. Bejan (born March 30, 1984) is an American political theorist and author. She is a professor of political theory in the department of politics and international relations at the University of Oxford and a fellow of Oriel College, moving to Oxford from the University of Toronto in 2015.

== Career ==
She received her PhD with distinction from Yale University in 2013 and won the American Political Science Association's 2015 Leo Strauss Award for the best doctoral dissertation in political philosophy. She holds degrees from the University of Chicago and University of Cambridge.

Her 2017 book Mere Civility: Disagreement and the Limits of Toleration, published by Harvard University Press, examines contemporary handling of civility, disagreement and freedom of speech in the light of arguments by the 17th-century thinkers Thomas Hobbes, John Locke and Roger Williams. She argues in Mere Civility that Roger Williams' approach of open disagreement with, and even expression of contempt for, opponents is a stronger basis for a liberal and inclusive society than the approaches of Hobbes or Locke, on the grounds that both Hobbes and Locke see a role for suppression and exclusion in building a tolerant society.

Bejan gave the Balzan-Skinner lecture at the University of Cambridge on 22 April 2016, entitled Acknowledging Equality, in which she questioned modern conceptions of equality through examining 'ideas of equality as a political principle, a religious commitment, and a social practice in seventeenth-century England.'

In the aftermath of Donald Trump's election as president, Bejan argued against the use of calls for civility by both Trump's supporters and opponents as a way to silence those who disagree with them.

In 2021 Bejan was awarded the Philip Leverhulme Prize in Politics, in recognition of the international impact of her research. In March 2023, a photographic portrait of Bejan was hung in the Manor Road Building, which houses the University of Oxford's departments of economics and politics, as part of a celebration of 100 years of women in philosophy, politics and economics.
