= Britain and Ireland Association for Political Thought =

Political studies association

- Founder: Richard Bellamy
- Established: 2008
- Mission: The promotion of the study of political thought in Britain and Ireland
- Focus: Political theory, History of political thought
- Chair: Robert Lamb
- Location: United Kingdom
- Website: https://www.associationforpoliticalthought.ac.uk

The Britain and Ireland Association for Political Thought (BIAPT) is an organisation dedicated to the study and promotion of political theory and the history of political thought in Britain and Ireland. It was founded in 2008 to foster cooperation among scholars and promote political‑thought research in the Britain and Ireland region.

== Awards ==
=== The BIAPT Early Career Prize ===
This annual award recognises outstanding contributions to research and teaching in political thought by early‑career scholars.

- 2020: Joint award: Paul Sagar and Teresa Bejan
- 2021: Emily McTernan
- 2022: Alasia Nuti
- 2023: Camila Vergara
- 2024: Josh Milburn
- 2025: Joe Davidson
- 2026: Shuk Ying Chang

=== The BIAPT Mid‑Career Prize ===
This award honours scholars more than eight years from their PhD (but not full Professors) who have significantly contributed to research, teaching and service in political thought.

- 2020: Matt Sleat
- 2021: Humeira Iqtidar
- 2022: Robin Douglass
- 2023: Alfred Moore
- 2024: Onur Ulas Ince
- 2025: Jemima Repo
- 2026: Paul Sagar

== See also ==
- Political Studies Association
- American Political Science Association
