= Spitz Prize =

Book award

The David and Elaine Spitz Prize is an award for a book in liberal and/or democratic theory.

The Spitz Prize is awarded annually for the best book in the field published two years earlier. To be eligible, the book must be primarily theoretical rather than historical, and not a textbook or edited work. The prize is awarded by a panel of political scholars under the auspices of the International Conference for the Study of Political Thought (CSPT), "an international, interdisciplinary organization of scholars and informed citizens interested in preserving and encouraging a broad, humanistic style of thinking about politics."

== List ==
Winners of the David and Elaine Spitz Prize:

- 1988 – Joseph Raz for The Morality of Freedom
- 1989 – Richard E. Flathman for The Philosophy and Politics of Freedom
- 1990 – no award given
- 1991 – Robert A. Dahl for Democracy and Its Critics
- 1992 – Charles W. Anderson for Pragmatic Liberalism
- 1993 – William Galston for Liberal Purposes: Goods, Virtues, and Diversity in the Liberal State
- 1994 – George Kateb for The Inner Ocean: Individualism and Democratic
- 1995 – John Rawls for Political Liberalism
- 1996 – William E. Scheuerman for Between the Norm and the Exception: The Frankfurt School and the Rule of Law
- 1997 – Mark Kingwell for A Civil Tongue: Justice, Dialogue, and the Politics of Pluralism
- 1998 – John Dryzek for Democracy in Capitalist Times: Ideals, Limits, and Struggles
- 1999 – Richard Dagger for Civic Virtues: Rights, Citizenship, and Republican Liberalism
- 2000 – no award given
- 2001 – Thomas A. Spragens, Jr. for Civic Liberalism: Reflections on Our Democratic Ideals
- 2002 – no award given
- 2003 – Mark E. Warren for Democracy and Association
- 2004 – Nadia Urbinati for Mill on Democracy: From the Athenian Polis to Representative Government
- 2005 – Ira Katznelson for Desolation and Enlightenment: Political Knowledge After Total War, Totalitarianism, and the Holocaust
- 2006 – Sheldon S. Wolin for Politics and Vision: Continuity and Innovation in Western Political Thought
- 2007 – George Klosko for Political Obligations
- 2008 – Martha Nussbaum for Frontiers of Justice: Disability, Nationality, Species Membership
- 2009 – Richard Bellamy for Political Constitutionalism: a Republican Defence of the Constitutionality of Democracy
- 2010 – Sharon Krause for Civil Passions: Moral Sentiment and Democratic Deliberation
- 2011 – Murray Milgate and Shannon C. Stimson for After Adam Smith: A Century of Transformation in Politics and Political Economy
- 2012 – Paul Weithman for Why Political Liberalism?: On John Rawls's Political Turn
- 2013 – John P. McCormick for Machiavellian Democracy
- 2014 – Philip Pettit for On The People's Terms: A Republican Theory and Model of Democracy
- 2015 – Hélène Landemore for Democratic Reason: Politics, Collective Intelligence, and the Rule of the Many
- 2016 – Melissa Schwartzberg for Counting the Many: The Origins and Limits of Supermajority Rule
- 2017 – Wendy Brown for Undoing the Demos: Neoliberalism's Stealth Revolution
- 2018 – Tommie Shelby for Dark Ghettos: Injustice, Dissent, and Reform
- 2019 – Cécile Laborde for Liberalism's Religion
- 2020 – Jill Frank for Poetic Justice: Rereading Plato's "Republic" and Onur Ulas Ince for Colonial Capitalism and the Dilemmas of Liberalism
- 2021 – Katrina Forrester for In the Shadow of Justice: Postwar Liberalism and the Remaking of Political Philosophy and Massimiliano Tomba for Insurgent Universality: An Alternative Legacy of Modernity
