= Authority (management) =

Authority in project management is the power that gives a project manager the ability to act in the name of the project sponsor executive or on behalf of the organization.

There are several different types of authority that project managers can leverage:

- Positional authority (also referred to as formal or legitimate authority): refers to the project manager's authority enforced through the project charter or some other organizational means (organizational level, reporting relationship, etc.).
- Coercive authority (also referred to as penalty authority): refers to motivating staff by threat of punishment such as fear of losing a bonus, assigning unappealing work, losing status, issuing a formal reprimand or possibly even losing their job.
- Expert authority: achieved through formal mechanisms such as certifications or education. Project Managers have several formal certifications available from global certification bodies such as the Project Management Professional (PMP) or Prince2 Foundation. In addition, degrees or diplomas from universities or educational institutes can further confer expertise on a project manager. Finally, validated experience in a relative field and industry can associate a project manager as an expert in their field.
- Referent authority: for project managers this typically refers to the authority earned by displaying integrity, fairness and respect to others. This power enables project managers to gain the confidence of their teams even in the absence of formal/reward or penalty power. Referent authority is also associated with being accessible or approachable and possessing the necessary charisma to enable team members to share their ideas, feelings and concerns. Another perspective on referent authority is provided by French and Raven based on the groups or affiliations that the project manager belongs to, this can either be positive or negative.
- Reward authority: refers to positive reinforcement and the ability to award something of value.

Due to the temporary nature of projects, most project managers will rely primarily on expert and referent authority.

== See also ==
- Government authority
- Power (philosophy)
- French and Raven's bases of power
- Project Management
