= William E. Scheuerman =

American philosopher

- Born: 1965 (age 60–61)
- Awards: Spitz Prize

Education
- Education: Harvard University (PhD); Goethe University Frankfurt; Yale University (BA); LMU Munich; Wayne State University
- Thesis: Reason, Radicalism, and the Rule of Law: The Frankfurt School and the Crisis of Modern Law (1993)
- Doctoral advisor: Judith N. Shklar, Seyla Benhabib
- Other advisors: Michael Sandel, Bonnie Honig

Philosophical work
- Era: 21st-century philosophy
- Region: Western philosophy
- School: Critical theory
- Institutions: University of Pittsburgh; University of Minnesota; Indiana University Bloomington

William E. Scheuerman (born 1965) is an American philosopher and James H. Rudy Professor of Political Science at Indiana University Bloomington. He is known for his works on political theory.

== Life ==
Scheuerman obtained a B.A. in philosophy at Yale University in 1987. He also spent a year abroad at LMU Munich from 1985 to 1986 on the Junior Year in Munich Program sponsored by Wayne State University.

Starting in 1987 he was a PhD student in Harvard University's Department of Government, while again spending a year from 1990 to 1991 in Germany at Goethe University Frankfurt. He obtained his Ph.D. in political science from Harvard University in 1993, with a dissertation titled "Reason, Radicalism, and the Rule of Law: The Frankfurt School and the Crisis of Modern Law". His committee members included Judith N. Shklar (co-chair), Seyla Benhabib (co-chair), Michael Sandel, and Bonnie Honig.

He was an assistant professor from 1993 until 1998 and associate professor from 1998 until 2000 at the University of Pittsburgh, associate professor from 2000 until 2003 and professor of political science and affiliated professor of law from 2003 until 2005 at the University of Minnesota. Since then, he has been a professor of political science at Indiana University Bloomington.

== Prizes ==
He is a winner of the David and Elaine Spitz Prize for his book Between the Norm and the Exception: The Frankfurt School and the Rule of Law in 1996. He has received fellowships from DAAD, the Humboldt Foundation, and a Fulbright Award in 2016.

== Publications ==
=== Articles ===
His work has been published in Constellations, History of Political Thought, International Theory, Journal of Political Philosophy, Politics & Society, Review of International Studies, and Social Research, among others.

=== Books ===
- Between the Norm and the Exception: The Frankfurt School and the Rule of Law (MIT, 1994)
- The Rule of Law Under Siege (ed.) (California, 1996)
- The End of Law: Carl Schmitt in the Twenty-First Century (Rowman & Littlefield, 1999)
- From Liberal Democracy to Fascism: Legal and Political Thought in the Weimar Republic (ed. with Peter Caldwell) (Humanities Press, 2000)
- Liberal Democracy and the Social Acceleration of Time (Johns Hopkins, 2004)
- Frankfurt School Perspectives on Globalization, Democracy, and the Law (Routledge 2008)
- Hans J. Morgenthau: Realism and Beyond (Polity, 2009)
- High-Speed Society: Social Acceleration, Power, and Modernity (ed. with Hartmut Rosa) (Penn State, 2009)
- The Realist Case for Global Reform (Polity, 2011)
- Civil Disobedience (Polity Press, 2018)
- The Cambridge Companion to Civil Disobedience (ed.) (Cambridge University Press, 2021)
- Property Disobedience as Protest: Rethinking Political Nonviolence (University of Pennsylvania Press, 2026)
