= Melissa Schwartzberg =

American political scientist

- Born: 1975 (age 50–51)
- Education: Washington University in St. Louis; New York University
- Awards: Guggenheim Fellowship; Spitz Prize; David Easton Award
- Scientific career
- Fields: Political science
- Workplaces: The George Washington University; Columbia University; New York University; Princeton University

Melissa Schwartzberg (born 1975) is an American political scientist. She is Laurance S. Rockefeller Professor of Politics and the University Center for Human Values at Princeton University. She studies democratic theory, constitutionalism, and both ancient and recent political institutions and political thought. She has written books on the conflict between democratic theory and entrenched laws, on the tradeoff between supermajoritarian and majoritarian rulesets, and on bargaining in democratic politics.

== Education and early work ==
Schwartzberg attended Washington University in St. Louis, graduating in 1996 with a BA in political science and classics. She then studied politics at New York University, earning a PhD in 2002. In 2002, Schwartzberg became a professor at The George Washington University. In 2006 she moved to Columbia University, where she remained until 2013, when she joined the faculty at New York University. While at NYU she was appointed the Silver Professor of Politics, and was affiliated with its Department of Classics and School of Law. In 2026 she joined the faculty at Princeton University.

== Career ==
Schwartzberg's first book was Democracy and Legal Change, published in 2007. She studies the question of entrenched laws which are difficult or impossible to amend. Schwartzberg argues that amending even fundamental laws is a central democratic activity, and that laws which cannot be changed by a democratic majority or by supramajoritarian amendment procedures are damaging to democracy. In addition to motivating this view abstractly, Schwartzberg discusses specific cases in which damage was done by laws because those laws were not changeable, including the sunset provision of Article Five of the United States Constitution that protected the clause in Article 1 which guaranteed that congress could not restrict the importation of slaves. Schwartzberg's view of laws as a living project aligns with the views of Jürgen Habermas.

In 2014, Schwarzberg published Counting the Many: The Origins and Limits of Supermajority Rule. In this book she continues to consider the nature and values of majoritarian decision-making rules, examining the idea that supermajoritarian decision rules are a safeguard against the dangers of democracy. She provides both a history of the use of supermajority rule and a normative discussion of its value, noting that supermajoritarian rules are in an indeterminate region between majoritarian rules and unanimous rules. She studies the failure of several major recent referendums to meet a supermajoritarian threshold despite passing a majority threshold, such as the Equal Rights Amendment and the election reform proposals of the British Columbia Citizens' Assembly on Electoral Reform, while also situating these events in a pattern which dates to Ancient Greece. Schwartzberg argues that supermajority rule, though it attempts to compensate for the problems with majority rule, introduces additional liabilities and biases. Counting the Many received the 2016 David and Elaine Spitz Prize from the International Conference for the Study of Political Thought, which is awarded for the best book in liberal and/or democratic theory published each year.

In 2018, Schwartzberg was named Julius Silver, Roslyn S. Silver, and Enid Silver Winslow Professor of Politics at New York University. In 2020, Schwartzberg was awarded the Guggenheim Fellowship, which is awarded each year to "175 scholars, artists, and writers" based on "prior achievement and exceptional promise". In the same year, she was awarded an American Council for Learned Societies Fellowship.

In 2024 she coauthored Democratic Deals: A Defense of Political Bargaining with Jack Knight. Democratic Deals was awarded the David Easton Prize from the Foundations of Political Theory Section of the American Political Science Association.

Schwartzberg's work has been reviewed, or she has been interviewed or quoted, in media outlets such as The New Republic, The Washington Post, and Bustle.

== Selected works ==
- Democracy and Legal Change (2007)
- Counting the Many: The Origins and Limits of Supermajority Rule (2014)
- "Epistemic Democracy and Its Challenges", Annual Review of Political Science (2015)

== Selected awards ==
- Spitz Prize (2016)
- Guggenheim Fellow (2020)
