= Richard Bellamy (philosopher) =

British political philosopher

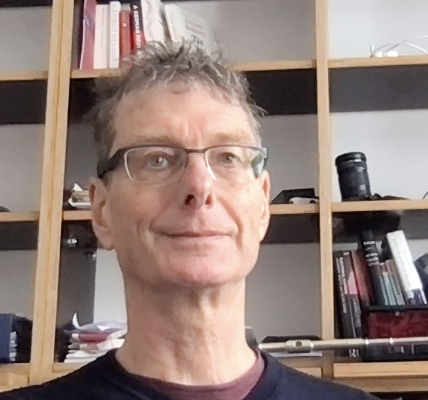
- Born: June 15, 1957 (age 69); Glasgow
- Awards: FBA, FAcSS, MAE, Spitz Prize, Serena Medal

Education
- Education: University of Cambridge, European University Institute
- Thesis: Liberalism and Historicism: History and Politics in the Thought of Benedetto Croce (1983)
- Doctoral advisor: Quentin Skinner

Philosophical work
- Era: 21st-century philosophy
- Region: Western philosophy
- Institutions: University College London
- Main interests: political philosophy

Richard Bellamy FBA FAcSS MAE (born 15 June 1957) is a British political philosopher and Professor of Political Science at University College London. He is best known for his historical work on the Italian tradition of legal and political thought and his own writings in legal and political philosophy. Bellamy won the David and Elaine Spitz Prize in 2009 for his book Political Constitutionalism: a Republican Defence of the Constitutionality of Democracy. In 2012 he was awarded the Serena Medal by the British Academy, given 'for eminent services towards the furtherance of the study of Italian history, philosophy or music, literature, art, or economics.' Bellamy has been the lead editor of the Critical Review of International Social and Political Philosophy (CRISPP) since 2003. He was elected a Fellow of the Academy of Social Sciences (FAcSS) in 2008, a Fellow of the British Academy (FBA) in 2022, and a Member of the Academia Europaea (MAE) in 2024.

== Career ==
Bellamy was educated at Haberdashers' Aske's Boys' School and the Lycée des Nations La Châtaigneraie. He read History at Trinity Hall, Cambridge, where he held a college scholarship, graduating with a ‘First’ and the Charles Crawley Prize in 1979. Afterwards, also at Cambridge, he did a PhD on ‘Liberalism and Historicism: History and Politics in the Thought of Benedetto Croce’ under the supervision of Quentin Skinner, during which time he spent two years as a researcher at the European University Institute (EUI) in Florence from 1980–82. He completed his PhD in 1983. After a year teaching at the University of Pisa from 1982–83, he went on to a Junior Research Fellowship at Nuffield College, Oxford from 1983–86, where he was Junior Dean from 1984–86, and started the Nuffield Workshop in Political Theory, giving the first paper on 'Sex, Sin and Liberalism'. He was also Lecturer in the House of Politics at Christ Church from 1984–86. He was a Fellow and College Lecturer in History at Jesus College, Cambridge and Lector in History at Trinity College, Cambridge from 1986–88. He left for a Lectureship in Politics at the University of Edinburgh from 1988–92, and then held Chairs at the Universities of East Anglia from 1992–95, Reading from 1995–2002, and Essex from 2002–05. He has been at University College London since 2005, where he was the founding Head of the Political Science Department 2005–2010.

Richard Bellamy was Academic Director of the European Consortium for Political Research (ECPR) from 2002 to 2006 and Founding Chair of the Britain and Ireland Association for Political Thought from 2008 to 2013. He was seconded to the EUI as Director of the Max Weber Programme from 2014 to 2019 and to the Hertie School of Governance in Berlin as Visiting Professor of Ethics and Public Policy from 2022 to 2024. He has also held Visiting Fellowships at Nuffield College, Oxford; the EUI; Australia National University (ANU); the Centre for Advanced Study (CAS) in Oslo; and the Hanse Wissenschaft-Kolleg (HWK) in Delmenhorst.

Bellamy has published 12 monographs, 30 (co-)edited volumes, over 90 journal articles and more than 80 book chapters. He has also edited translations of texts by Beccaria, Bobbio and Gramsci. His own writings have been translated into French, German, Arabic, Italian, Japanese, Persian, Chinese, Indonesian, Portuguese, Czech, Turkish, and Spanish.

== Books ==
- Modern Italian Social Theory: Ideology and Politics from Pareto to the Present, John Wiley & Sons, 1991
- Liberalism and Modern Society: An Historical Argument, John Wiley & Sons, 1992
- Gramsci and the Italian State, with Darrow Schecter, Manchester Univ Press, 1993
- Liberalism and Pluralism: Towards a Politics of Compromise, Routledge, 1999
- Rethinking Liberalism, Continuum, 2005
- Political Constitutionalism: A Republican Defence of the Constitutionality of Democracy, Cambridge University Press, 2007
- Citizenship: A Very Short Introduction, Oxford University Press, 2008
- Croce, Gramsci, Bobbio and the Italian Political Tradition, Rowman and Littlefield, 2013
- A Republican Europe of States: Cosmopolitanism, Intergovernmentalism and Democracy in the EU, Cambridge University Press, 2019
- From Maastricht to Brexit: Democracy, Constitutionalism and Citizenship in the EU, with Dario Castiglione, Rowman and Littlefield, 2019
- Flexible Europe: Differentiated Integration, Fairness and Democracy, with Sandra Kröger and Marta Lorimer, Bristol University Press, 2022
- Defending the Political Constitution, Oxford University Press, 2026

=== Edited Books ===
- Victorian Liberalism, Routledge, 1990 – reissued 2024
- Theories and Concepts of Politics: An Introduction Manchester, Manchester University Press, 1993
- (with Angus Ross), A Textual Introduction to Social and Political Thought, Manchester University Press, 1996
- (with Dario Castiglione), Constitutionalism in Transformation, Blackwell, 1996
- (with Martin Hollis), Pluralism and Liberal Neutrality, Routledge 1999
- (with Alex Warleigh), Citizenship and Governance in the EU, Continuum, 2001
- (with Andrew Mason), Political Concepts, Manchester University Press, 2003
- (with Terry Ball), The Cambridge History of Twentieth Century Political Thought, Cambridge University Press, 2003
- (with Dario Castiglione and Emilio Santoro), Lineages of European Citizenship, Palgrave, 2004
- The Rule of Law and the Separation of Powers, Routledge 2005
- (with D. Castiglione and J. Shaw), Making European Citizens: Civic Inclusion in a Transnational Context, Palgrave, 2006
- Public Ethics, Routledge 2010
- (with Sandra Kröger), Representation and Democracy in the EU: Does the One Come at the Expense of the Other?, Routledge, 2014
- (with Joseph Lacey), Political Theory and the European Union, Routledge 2017
- (with Joseph Lacey and Kalypso Nicolaïdis), European Boundaries in Question?, Routledge, 2018
- (with Jeff King), The Cambridge Handbook of Constitutional Theory, Cambridge University Press, 2025
