= The Problem of Political Authority =

2013 book by Michael Huemer

- Cover of the first edition
- Author: Michael Huemer
- Language: English
- Subject: Political philosophy
- Published: January 2013 (Palgrave Macmillan)
- Publication place: United States
- Media type: Print
- Pages: 394
- ISBN: 978-1137281654

The Problem of Political Authority: An Examination of the Right to Coerce and the Duty to Obey is a book by University of Colorado philosophy professor Michael Huemer, published in January 2013. The first part of the book details Huemer's interpretation of philosophical anarchism and argues against the legitimacy of political authority, while the second addresses political anarchism and the practical viability of anarcho-capitalism.

== History and promotion ==
In April 2011, while he was still writing the book (then titled Freedom and Authority), Huemer was profiled by the Arts and Sciences Magazine of the University of Colorado, Boulder. The profile quoted Huemer as saying that political authority is "a moral illusion we're suffering from."

In May 2012, a few months prior to the publication of the book, Huemer defended the argument of the book in a video.

== Reception ==
Ole Martin Moen of the University of Oslo, Norway, reviewed the book in Philosophical Quarterly. Moen concluded his review by writing: "In addition to being a solid scholarly work, Huemer's book will work well as assigned reading in classes on political philosophy. It is bound to spark debate, and its inclusion would help remedy the sad fact that anarchism is often either ignored or put aside without serious engagement. This is a pity, for even if one rejects his conclusions, Huemer makes it clear that anarchism is a sophisticated theory that deserves careful consideration."

The book has also been reviewed in Ethics by George Klosko, Mind by Daniel Viehoff, and Le Québécois Libre by Bradley Doucet.

== Related books by others ==
- The Machinery of Freedom by David D. Friedman lays out the groundwork of the vision of an anarcho-capitalist society that Huemer builds on in Part II.
- For a New Liberty by Murray Rothbard provides (along with Friedman's work) much of the basis for Chapter 10's discussion of "Individual Security in a Stateless Society".
- Chaos Theory by Robert P. Murphy.
- Order Without Law: How Neighbors Settle Disputes by Robert C. Ellickson.
- Libertarian Anarchy: Against the State by Gerard Casey (philosopher).
