= John P. McCormick (political scientist) =

American philosopher (born 1966)

- Born: 1966 (age 59–60)
- Awards: Spitz Prize

Education
- Education: University of Chicago (MA, PhD), Queens College, CUNY (BA)

Philosophical work
- Era: 21st-century philosophy
- Region: Western philosophy
- Institutions: University of Chicago
- Main interests: political philosophy

John P. McCormick (born 1966) is an American political scientist and Karl J. Weintraub Professor at the University of Chicago. He is known for his works on political theory.

== Life ==
McCormick graduated from Queens College, CUNY in 1988 with a BA in Political Science and Philosophy. He studied at University of Chicago/Graduate Center, CUNY (1989–90) with an MA in Political Science. He obtained a PhD in Political Science from The University of Chicago in 1995.

He taught at the University of New Hampshire and Yale University, before serving as a Professor in Political Science Department at The University of Chicago since 2006.

== Prize ==
McCormick is a winner of the 2013 Elaine and David Spitz Prize for his book Machiavellian Democracy.

== Books ==
- The People’s Princes: Machiavelli, Leadership, and Liberty (Chicago: University of Chicago Press, 2025).
- Reading Machiavelli: Scandalous Books, Suspect Engagements and the Virtue of Populist Politics (Princeton University Press, 2018).
- Machiavellian Democracy (Cambridge University Press, 2011).
- Weber, Habermas, and Transformations of the European State: Constitutional, Social and Supranational Democracy (Cambridge University Press, 2007).
- Carl Schmitt’s Critique of Liberalism: Against Politics as Technology (Cambridge University Press, 1997).
