= Jill Frank =

American political philosopher

- Awards: Spitz Prize, David Easton Award

Education
- Education: University of California, Berkeley (PhD)

Philosophical work
- Era: 21st-century philosophy
- Region: Western philosophy
- Institutions: Cornell University
- Main interests: Political philosophy, Ancient Greek philosophy, Democratic theory, History of political thought

Jill Frank is an American political philosopher and President White Professor of History and Political Science and the Robert J. Katz Chair of the Department of Government at Cornell University. She is known for her work on ancient Greek political philosophy, Plato, Thucydides, democratic theory, and the history of political thought. She is a winner of the David and Elaine Spitz Prize and the David Easton Award for her book Poetic Justice: Rereading Plato's "Republic".

== Books ==
- A Democracy of Distinction: Aristotle and the Work of Politics (University of Chicago Press, 2005)
- Poetic Justice: Rereading Plato's "Republic" (University of Chicago Press, 2018)
