= Krishna Kafle =

Nepalese singer (born 1988)

Krishna Kafle कृष्ण काफ्ले
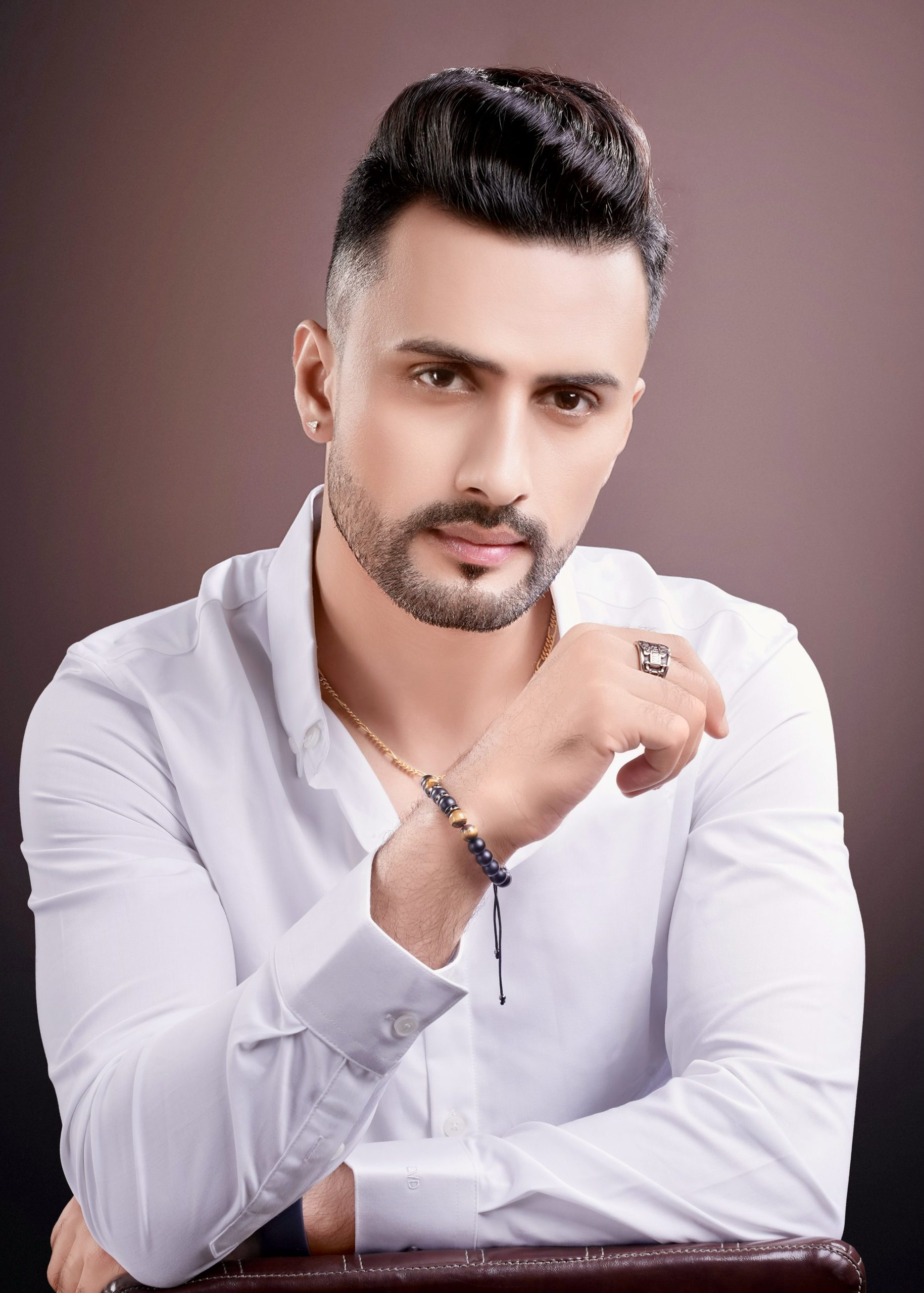

Background information
- Born: Krishna Prasad Kafle; 2 October; Syangja District, Nepal
- Origin: Nepal
- Genres: Filmy; Modern; Pop; Folk; Semi-classical
- Occupation: Playback singer
- Instruments: Vocals
- Years active: 2007–present
- Labels: Music Nepal; Highlight Nepal; Budha Subba Digital; Sairam Pictures
- Member of: Music Royalty Collection Society Nepal; Film Artist Worker's Organization of Nepal (FAWON)
- Website: krishnakafle.com.np

Krishna Kafle (Nepali: कृष्ण काफ्ले) is a Nepalese playback singer born on October 2, in Syangja Nepal. He has been actively involved in the Nepali music industry since 2007 AD.

"Parkha Parkha Mayalu", "Dekhana Champa", "Timro Picture Hit", "Maile Boleko Chhaina Dhatera", "Hane Maile Jhataro" and "Sake Hasauchhu" are some popular songs in his singing career. He has sung more than 500 songs. He has been honored from "Jana Sewa Shree Padak Pancham", by President of Nepal Bidya Devi Bhandari. Kafle has received numerous awards and recognition for his contribution to the Nepali music industry. Also, he has been awarded from National Rapati Music Awards and Kamana Film Awards.

== Songs ==
Movie songs
SN	Song name	Movie name	ref
1	Parkha Parkha mayalu	Mangalam	
2	Dekhana Champa	chhaka panja	
3	Timro Picture Hit	Kismat -2	
4	Haane Maile Jhataro	Maruni	
5	Timro Hamro Mayama	Birangana	
6	Tala Chabi	Brindawan	
7	Timima Haraya	Rudra	

General Songs
SN	Song name	Gener	ref
1	Maya Basyo		
2	A Hawa	Modern	
3	Bhamara	Folk Modern	
4	Dharaharama Basyo Maya Jal	Lok Pop	
5	Numbari Bhela	Modern	
6	Aayo Teej	Teej Song	
7	Maya	Modern	
8	Choli ko tuna		
9	Sake Hasauchhu		
10	Bhamara		
11	Chata Mayalu		
12	Ghari ghari		
13	Timilai Runa Dinna		
14	Singadarbar Jhyal ma Aaina		
15	Mero Nasa Nasama		
16	Samjhinu Sajilo Chha		
17	Sake Hasauchhu		
18	Chakhum Chakhum		
19	Jindagi ko bhar chhaina		
20	Deep Bhai Balirahu		
21	Timilai Dekhda		
22	Maile Boleko Chhaina Dhatera		
23	Rajamati	-	
24	Timi Aayau		
25	Ma Geetharuma Dubera		
26	Siklesaiko Seto Topi		
27	Chautariko Dilaima		

== Awards ==
SN	Awards Title	Category	Song name	Result	ref
1	Music Khabar Music Award 2015 AD	Best Singer Male (Pop Song)	Maya Basyo	Won	
2	14th Kalika Fm Music Award 2075 (BS) (Note: Year in Bikram Sambat calendar; Gregorian calendar year 2018)	Best Playback Singer	Parkha Parkha Mayalu	Won	
3	Lux Kamana Film Award 2075 (BS)	Best Playback Singer (Male)	Parkha Parkha Mayalu	Nominated	
4	National Rapati Music Award 2017 (AD) (Note: Gregorian calendar year 2016)	Best Playback Singer (Male)	Dekhana Champa from movie Chhakka Panja	Won	
5	Music Khabar Music Award 2017(AD)	Best Playback Singer (Male)	Dekhana Champa	Won	
6	9th D Cine Award 2017 (AD)	Best Playback singer Male	Chhakka Panja (Dekhana Champa)	Won	
7	National Power News Music Award 2019 AD	Best Pop Singer (Male)	Aama	Won	
8	International Himalayan Awards	Best Modern Song	Sake Hasauchhu	Nominated	
9	14th Kalika FM Music Award,2018 AD	Best Popular Song (Male)	Parkha Parkha Mayalu	Won	
10	Sundara Devi Music Award, 2017 AD	Best Modern Singer	Maya Pirati	Won	
11	(NIM) National Inclusive Music Award,2021 AD	Best Singer (Male)	Chakhum Chakhum	Won	
12	(NFMA) Nepal Music & Fashion Award, 2021 AD	Best Singer (Male)	Maile Boleko Chaina Dhatera	Won	
13	Lux Kamana Award 2018 AD	Best Playback Singer	Dekhana Champa	Won	
14	(NIM) National Inclusive Music Award,2023AD	Best SInger Lok Pop	Sake Hasauchhu	Won	
15	12th D Cine Award 2017 (AD)	Best Playback Singer (Male)	Maruni (Hane Maile Jhataro)	Won	

== Honored ==
SN	Date	Honored From	ref
1	2077 (BS) (Note: Gregorian calendar year 2020)	Jana Sewa Shree Padak 2077 - Nepal Government	
2	2078 (BS) (Note: Gregorian calendar year 2021)	Natikaji Pratibha Puraskar - Honord from Natikaji Smriti Samaj	
3	2024 (AD)	Citation letter from the New York State Assembly, presented by Assembly member Steven Raga	
