= Paul Weithman =

American philosopher

Paul J. Weithman

Education
- Education: Harvard University (PhD), University of Notre Dame (BA)
- Doctoral advisor: John Rawls, Judith Shklar

Philosophical work
- Era: 21st-century philosophy
- Region: Western philosophy
- Institutions: University of Notre Dame
- Main interests: political philosophy

Paul J. Weithman is an American philosopher and Glynn Family Honors Professor of Philosophy at University of Notre Dame. He is known for his works on political philosophy. Weithman won the David and Elaine Spitz Prize in 2012 for his book Why Political Liberalism? On John Rawls's Political Turn.

== Books ==
- Rawls, Political Liberalism and Reasonable Faith, Cambridge University Press, 2016
- Why Political Liberalism? On John Rawls's Political Turn, Oxford University Press, 2010
- Religion and the Obligations of Citizenship, Cambridge University Press, 2002
