= Paul Sagar =

British political theorist

- Awards: BIAPT Early Career Award (2020) BIAPT Mid Career Award (2026)

Education
- Education: University of Cambridge (PhD, 2014); University of London (MA); University of Oxford (BA)

Philosophical work
- Era: 21st‑century philosophy
- Region: Western philosophy
- Institutions: King's College London
- Main interests: history of political thought, political theory, moral philosophy
- Website: https://www.paulsagar.com/

Paul Sagar is a British political theorist and Reader in Political Theory at King's College London. His work focuses on the history of political thought, especially the Scottish Enlightenment (including the works of David Hume and Adam Smith), as well as contemporary normative political theory.

Sagar is a quadriplegic due to a climbing incident in 2023.

== Books ==
- The Opinion of Mankind: Sociability and the Theory of the State from Hobbes to Smith (Princeton: Princeton University Press, 2018)
- Adam Smith Reconsidered: Liberty, History, and the Foundations of Modern Politics (Princeton: Princeton University Press, 2022)
- Basic Equality (Princeton: Princeton University Press, 2024)
- Interpreting Adam Smith: Critical Essays [editor] (Cambridge: Cambridge University Press, 2023)
