= George Klosko =

American philosopher (born 1950)

- Born: 1950 (age 75–76)
- Awards: Spitz Prize

Education
- Education: Columbia University (BA, PhD)
- Thesis: The Politics of Philosophy: The Origin and Development of Plato's Political Theory (1977)

Philosophical work
- Era: Contemporary philosophy
- Region: Western philosophy
- School: Analytic
- Institutions: University of Virginia
- Main interests: Political philosophy

George Klosko (born 1950) is an American philosopher and Professor Emeritus at the University of Virginia. He is known for his works on political theory.

Klosko received his B.A. and Ph.D. from Columbia University.

== Books ==
- The Development of Plato’s Political Theory (Methuen, 1986; Second Edition, Oxford, 2006)
- The Principle of Fairness and Political Obligation (Rowman and Littlefield, 1992)
- Political Obligations (Oxford University Press, 2005)
- The Oxford Handbook of the History of Political Philosophy (Oxford, 2011)
- The Transformation of American Liberalism (Oxford University Press, 2017)
- Why we should obey the law? (Polity Press, 2019)
