= Michael Huemer =

American philosopher (born 1969)

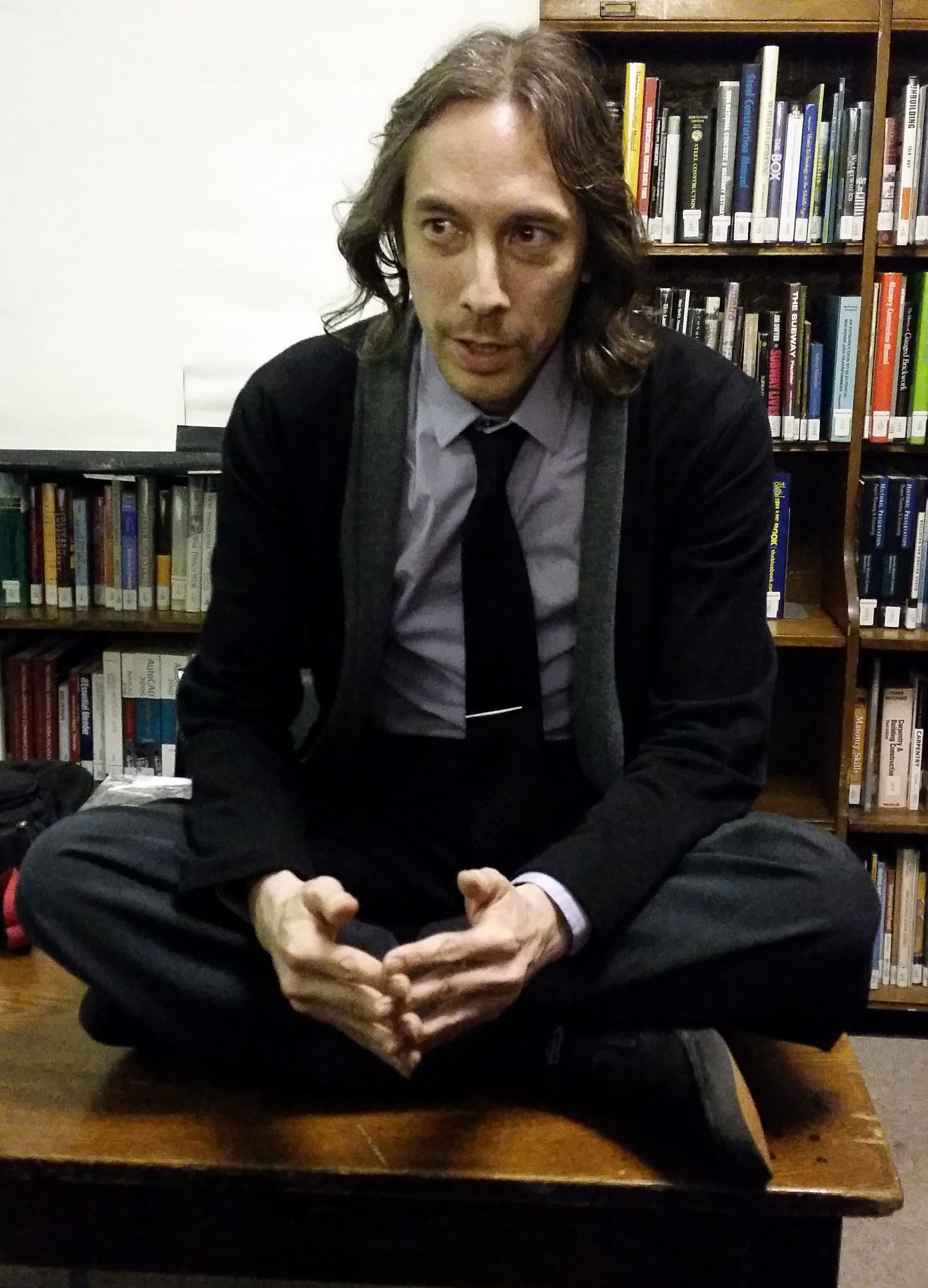
- Huemer in 2015
- Born: December 27, 1969 (age 56)

Education
- Education: University of California, Berkeley (BA); Rutgers University (PhD)

Philosophical work
- Era: Contemporary philosophy
- Region: Western philosophy: American philosophy
- School: Analytic philosophy; Anarcho-capitalism; Ethical intuitionism; Libertarianism
- Institutions: University of Colorado, Boulder
- Main interests: Epistemology; Ethics/meta-ethics; Politics; Meat consumption
- Notable works: Ethical Intuitionism (2005); The Problem of Political Authority (2013)
- Notable ideas: Phenomenal conservatism
- Website: owl232.net

Michael Huemer (/ˈhjuːmər/; born December 27, 1969) is an American professor of philosophy at the University of Colorado, Boulder. He has defended ethical intuitionism, direct realism, political libertarianism, phenomenal conservatism, substance dualism, reincarnation, the repugnant conclusion, and philosophical anarchism.

== Education and career ==
Huemer graduated from the University of California, Berkeley, and earned his Ph.D. at Rutgers University in 1998 under the supervision of Peter D. Klein.

== Philosophical work ==
Huemer is a philosophical dualist and an agnostic.

His 2005 book, Ethical Intuitionism, was reviewed in Notre Dame Philosophical Reviews, Philosophy and Phenomenological Research, and Mind.

In 2013, he published The Problem of Political Authority, in which he argues that modern arguments for political authority fail and that society can function properly without state coercion.

=== Phenomenal conservatism ===
Huemer has defended phenomenal conservatism, the epistemological view that it is reasonable to assume that things are as they appear, except when there are positive grounds for doubting this.

=== Problem of evil ===
Huemer has stated that the presence of evil in the world, such as children with terrible diseases, is strong evidence that an omnipotent, omniscient, and omnibenevolent God does not exist.

=== Reincarnation ===
Huemer defended reincarnation in his 2021 paper "Existence Is Evidence of Immortality". He has argued that immaterial souls exist, and in 2022, he debated Graham Oppy on the topic.

=== Animal ethics ===
On the ethics of eating meat, Huemer has commented that "In the overwhelming majority of actual cases, meat eaters do not have any reasons that could plausibly be claimed to justify the pain and suffering caused by their practice."

In 2016, he debated Bryan Caplan on the ethical treatment of animals, including insects. Regarding killing insects, he has argued that they are not raised in horrible conditions like animals in factory farms and that animal farming requires killing more insects, claiming that it is "much less likely that insects feel pain".

His 2019 book, Dialogues on Ethical Vegetarianism, is a series of dialogues on the ethics of eating meat. Peter Singer, who wrote the foreword to the book, commented that "In the future, when people ask me why I don't eat meat, I will tell them to read this book."

==== Ostroveganism ====
Huemer is an advocate of ostroveganism, a plant-based diet with the addition of oysters and other bivalves. In a 2023 interview, Huemer stated that it is "fair game" to eat animals without brains such as scallops and that he also occasionally eats pasture-raised eggs. He has argued that it is impossible to inflict pain on bivalves, because they do not have a brain.

== Personal life ==
Huemer is married to Iskra Fileva, a philosophy professor at the University of Colorado Boulder.

== Books ==
=== Authored ===
- Skepticism and the Veil of Perception (Rowman & Littlefield, 2001)
- Ethical Intuitionism (Palgrave Macmillan, 2005)
- The Problem of Political Authority (Palgrave Macmillan, 2013)
- Approaching Infinity (Palgrave Macmillan, 2016)
- Paradox Lost (Palgrave Macmillan, 2018)
- Dialogues on Ethical Vegetarianism (Routledge, 2019)
- Knowledge, Reality, and Value: A Mostly Common Sense Guide to Philosophy (independently published, 2021)
- Justice Before the Law (Palgrave Macmillan, 2021)
- Understanding Knowledge (independently published, 2021)
- Progressive Myths (independently published, 2024)

==== Book chapters ====
- Huemer, Michael (2018). "Part III: The Role of Property and the Market; Ch. 18: Is Wealth Redistribution a Rights Violation?". In Brennan, Jason; van der Vossen, Bas; Schmidtz, David (eds.). The Routledge Handbook of Libertarianism. London and New York: Taylor & Francis Group. pp. 259–271. ISBN 978-0367870591.

=== Co-authored ===
- Is Political Authority an Illusion?: A Debate (with Daniel Layman, Routledge, 2022)
- Can We Know Anything?: A Debate (with Bryan Frances, Routledge, 2023)

=== Edited ===
- Epistemology: Contemporary Readings (Routledge, 2002)
