= Phenomenal conservatism =

Concept within epistemology (philosophy)

In epistemology, phenomenal conservatism (PC) holds that it is reasonable to assume that things are as they appear, except when there are positive grounds for doubting this. (The term derives from the Greek word "phainomenon", meaning "appearance".)

The principle was initially defended by Michael Huemer in Huemer 2001, where it was formulated as follows:

- If it seems to S as if p, then S thereby has at least prima facie justification for believing that p.

A later formulation (Huemer 2007), designed to allow the principle to encompass inferential as well as foundational justification, reads as follows:

- If it seems to S that p, then, in the absence of defeaters, S thereby has at least some degree of justification for believing that p.

== Arguments for PC ==
Phenomenal conservatism has been defended on three grounds.

1. First, the principle enables one to account for the justification of most, perhaps all, of the beliefs that we commonly take as justified, including sensory observations, memory beliefs, and beliefs based on reasoning.
2. Second, it is argued that alternative epistemological positions are self-defeating in the sense that, unless PC is true, few or no beliefs would be justified, including beliefs in any alternative epistemological theories. This is supported by the claims
  - that all or nearly all beliefs are causally explained by appearances, that is, one believes a proposition because it seems true to one; and
  - that a belief is justified only if it is causally explained by a factor that constitutes justification for the proposition believed.
3. Third, it is argued that PC is most faithful to the motivations underlying epistemological internalism.

== Criticisms of PC ==
Critics of phenomenal conservatism have argued:

- That the principle is overly liberal, making far too many beliefs count as justified. In particular, PC implies that one is justified in believing a proposition that appears true to one, even in the absence of any reason for thinking that the faculty generating the appearance is reliable.
- That the self-defeat argument unfairly begs the question against skepticism.
- That the self-defeat argument cannot establish that externalist alternatives to PC are self-defeating without appeal to internalist assumptions.
- That the intuitions that seem to favor PC over rival internalist views support views on which fallacious reasoning can count as justified.
- That (in its original formulation) the principle makes inferential beliefs count as foundational.
- That PC enables a belief to be justified even when the relevant appearance (and so the belief) was ultimately caused by epistemically irresponsible behavior, such as wishful thinking.
- That seeming-based justification is elusive, in the sense that it can be destroyed by one's mere reflecting on one's seemings and speculating about their possible causes.

In addition, as a form of foundationalism, PC is open to some of the common objections to that doctrine.

== See also ==
- Epistemic justification
- Foundationalism
- Evidentialism
- Skepticism
- Problem of the criterion

== Annotated bibliography ==
1. Huemer, Michael. Skepticism and the Veil of Perception (Lanham, Md.: Rowman & Littlefield, 2001).
  - Source of the doctrine of phenomenal conservatism.
2. BonJour, Laurence. "In Search of Direct Realism," Philosophy and Phenomenological Research 69 (2004): 349-67.
  - Criticism of Huemer 2001.
3. Huemer, Michael. "Compassionate Phenomenal Conservatism," Philosophy and Phenomenological Research, 74 no. 1 (2007): 30-55.
  - Response to BonJour 2004, reformulation of the self-defeat argument.
4. Markie, Peter. "The Mystery of Perceptual Justification," Philosophical Studies, forthcoming.
  - Objects that PC is too liberal and enables beliefs caused by epistemically irresponsible behavior to be justified.
5. Steup, Matthias. "Internalist Reliabilism," Philosophical Issues 14 (2004): 403-25.
  - Makes the objection that PC is too liberal.
6. Huemer, Michael."Compassionate Phenomenal Conservatism," Philosophy and Phenomenological Research, 74 (2007): 30–55.
  - Huemer's weaker formulation of phenomenal conservatism.
7. Hanna, Nathan. "Against Phenomenal Conservatism," Acta Analytica 26 (3):213-221.
  - Argues that PC delivers the wrong verdicts by allowing beliefs to justify themselves.
8. Hasan, Ali. "Phenomenal conservatism, classical foundationalism, and internalist justification" Philosophical Studies, forthcoming.
  - Argues that the self-defeat argument for PC fails and that alternative internalist accounts of justification are preferable to PC.
9. Littlejohn, Clayton. "Defeating Phenomenal Conservatism," Analytic Philosophy 52 (2011): 35-48.
  - Argues that the self-defeat argument fails and that the internalist intuition that motivates PC can be used to support abhorrent moral views.
10. Tucker, Christopher. "Phenomenal Conservatism and Evidentialism in Religious Epistemology," In Kelly James Clark & Raymond J. VanArragon (eds.), Evidence and Religious Belief. Oxford University Press.
  - Appeals to PC to offer an account of justified religious belief.
11. Moretti, Luca. "Phenomenal Conservatism and the Problem of Reflective Awareness,"American Philosophical Quarterly 55 (2018): 167-180.
  - Argues that seeming-based justification is elusive, in the sense that it can be destroyed by one's mere reflecting on one's seemings and speculating about their possible causes.
