= Palgrave Macmillan =

English publishing house

- Parent company: Springer Nature
- Founded: 2000
- Country of origin: United Kingdom
- Headquarters location: London
- Publication types: Books, academic journals, monographs, ebooks
- No. of employees: 170
- Official website: palgrave.com

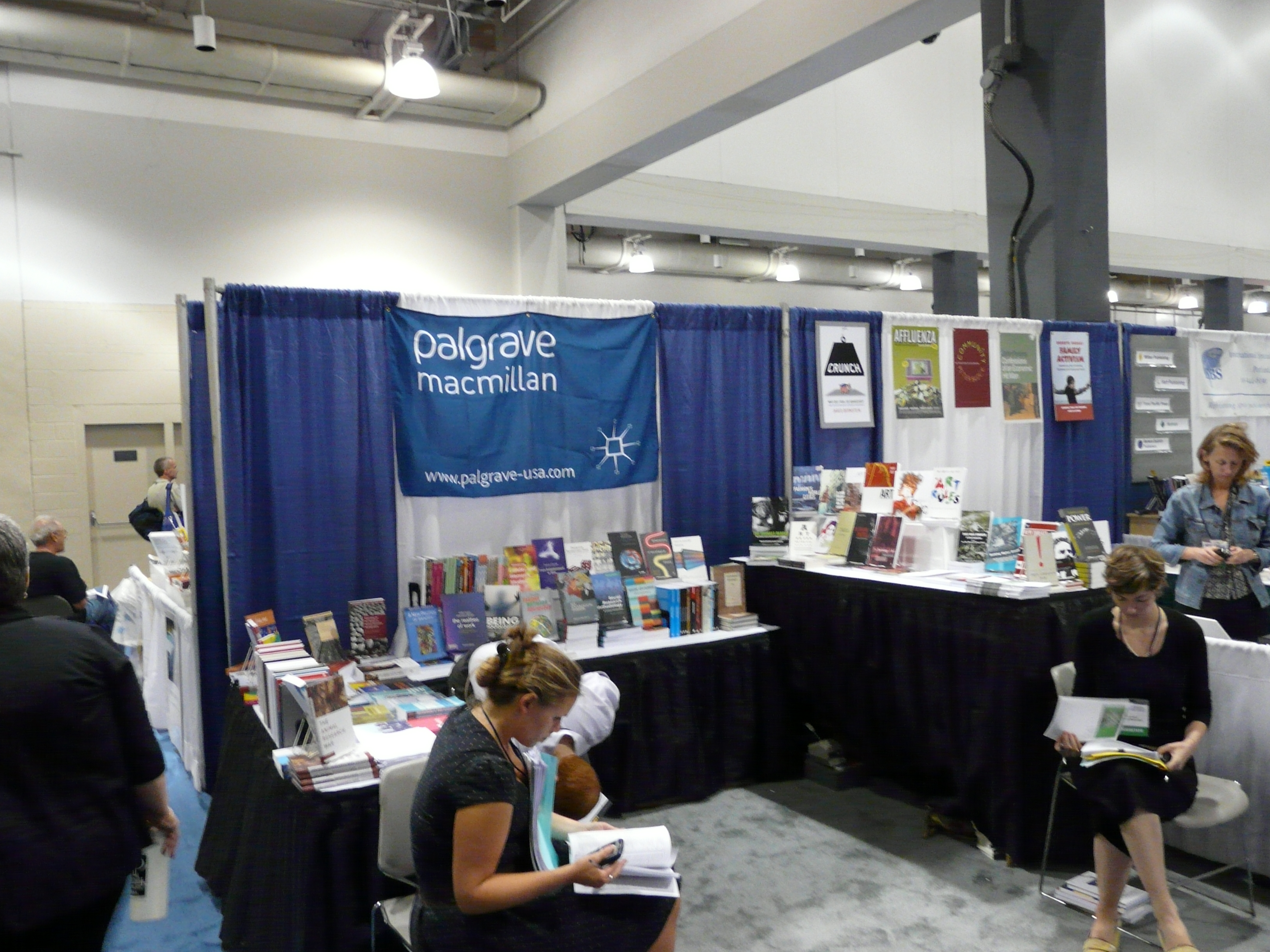
2008 conference booth

Palgrave Macmillan is a British academic and trade publishing company headquartered in the London Borough of Camden. Its programme includes textbooks, journals, monographs, professional and reference works in print and online. It maintains offices in London, New York, Shanghai, Melbourne, Sydney, Hong Kong, Delhi and Johannesburg.

Palgrave Macmillan was created in 2000 when St. Martin's Press in the US united with Macmillan Publishers in the UK to combine their worldwide academic publishing operations. The company was known simply as Palgrave until 2002, but has since been known as Palgrave Macmillan.

It is a subsidiary of Springer Nature. Until 2015, it was part of the Macmillan Group and therefore wholly owned by the German publishing company Holtzbrinck Publishing Group (which still owns a controlling interest in Springer Nature). As part of Macmillan, it was headquartered at the Macmillan campus in Kings Cross, London with other Macmillan companies including Pan Macmillan, Nature Publishing Group and Macmillan Education, having moved from Basingstoke in 2014.

== History ==
Palgrave is named after the Palgrave family. Classical historian Sir Francis Palgrave, who founded the Public Record Office, and his four sons were all closely tied with Macmillan Publishers in the 19th century:

- Francis Turner Palgrave acted as assistant private secretary to future Prime Minister William Ewart Gladstone, before creating his Palgrave's Golden Treasury in the English Language in 1861, which was published by Macmillan and became a standard work for almost a century.
- Inglis Palgrave was the editor of The Palgrave Dictionary of Political Economy, which was first published by Macmillan in 1894, 1896 and 1899 and the inspiration for The New Palgrave: A Dictionary of Economics was published in 1987. He was a banker and editor of The Economist.
- Reginald Palgrave was Clerk of the House of Commons and wrote A History of the House of Commons, which Macmillan published in 1869.
- William Gifford Palgrave was an Arabic scholar. He wrote a two-volume work describing his travels and adventures for Macmillan called Narrative of a Year's Journey through Central and Eastern Arabia (1865), which was the most widely read book on the region until the account by T. E. Lawrence was published.

Palgrave Macmillan publishes The Statesman's Yearbook, an annual reference work which gives a political, economic and social overview of every country of the world. In 2008, Palgrave Macmillan published The New Palgrave Dictionary of Economics, 2nd edition, edited by Steven N. Durlauf and Lawrence E. Blume. In 2009, Palgrave Macmillan made over 4,500 scholarly ebooks available to libraries.

== Distribution clients ==
Palgrave Macmillan represents the sales, marketing and distribution interests of W. H. Freeman, Worth Publishers, Sinauer Associates, and University Science Books outside the US, Canada, Australia and the Far East.

Palgrave Macmillan previously distributed I.B. Tauris in the U.S. and Canada; and Manchester University Press, Pluto Press, and Zed Books in the U.S.

In Australia, Palgrave represents both the Macmillan Group, including Palgrave Macmillan and Nature Publishing Group, and a variety of other academic publishers, including Acumen Publishing, Atlas & Co, Bedford-St. Martin's, Cold Spring Harbor Laboratory Press, Continuum International Publishing Group, David Fulton, Gerald Duckworth and Company, W. H. Freeman, Haymarket Books, Henry Holt, I.B. Tauris, Learning Matters, Lynne Reiner Publishers, Macquarie Library, New Internationalist, The New Press, Ocean Press, Perseus Books Group, Pluto Press, Routledge/Taylor and Francis, Saqi Books, Scion Publishers, Seven Stories Press, Sinauer Associates, Tilde University Press, University Science Books, and Zed Books.

Palgrave has been criticised for a pricing structure which "will limit readership to the privileged few", as opposed to options for "open access without tears" offered by DOAJ, Unpaywall and DOAB.

== Palgrave Pivot ==
Launched in 2012, Palgrave Pivot is an imprint of Palgrave Macmillan, aimed at publishing shorter, "rigorously peer-reviewed" monographs, focused on new important research across the Humanities and Social Sciences.

== Authors ==
Notable authors include (alphabetically by last name):

- Jonathan Bate, is a British academic, biographer, critic, broadcaster, novelist and scholar of Shakespeare, Romanticism and Ecocriticism, and editor of The RSC Shakespeare: The Collected Works
- Darioush Bayandor, a former Iranian diplomat and retired United Nations regional coordinator for humanitarian aid. Bayandor wrote a revisionist analysis of the 1953 Iranian coup d'état: Iran and The CIA: The Fall of Mosaddeq Revisited (2010).
- John R. Bradley, journalist and middle-east expert, and author of After the Arab Spring: How Islamists Hijacked The Middle East Revolts and Inside Egypt: The Land of Pharaohs on the Brink of a Revolution
- Juan Cole, is Richard P. Mitchell Collegiate Professor of History at the University of Michigan, and author of Engaging the Muslim World
- Larry Elliot and Dan Atkinson, economics editors at The Guardian and The Mail on Sunday, authors of Going South: Why Britain will have a Third World Economy by 2014.
- Andrew Gamble, Professor of Politics at Cambridge University and author of The Spectre at the Feast
- Fawaz Gerges, professor of Middle Eastern Politics and International Relations at the London School of Economics and Political Science, where he is chair of the Middle Eastern Center. He is the author of Obama and the Middle-East: The End of America's Moment?
- Michael Huemer, professor of philosophy at University of Colorado, Boulder. Books include The Problem of Political Authority, a defense of philosophical libertarianism and anarchism; and Ethical Intuitionism, a meta-ethical defense of ethical intuitionism.
- Marco Katz Montiel, composes music and teaches literature at MacEwan University, Music and Identity in Twentieth-Century Literature from Our America – Noteworthy Protagonists, Palgrave Macmillan, ISBN 978-1-137-43332-9
- Fawzia Koofi, Afghan MP, the first female candidate in 2014 Afghanistan Presidential elections, and author of The Favored Daughter
- John Logsdon, Professor Emeritus of Political Science and International Affairs at George Washington University, and author of John F. Kennedy and the Race to the Moon, 2013. ISBN 978-1137346490
- Juan E. Méndez, UN Special Rapporteur on Torture, and author of Taking a Stand
- Abbas Milani, an Iranian scholar at Stanford University, who wrote The Shah (2011) about the life of Mohammad Reza Pahlavi.
- David Niose, president of Secular Coalition for America and American Humanist Association and author of Nonbeliever Nation: The Rise of Secular Americans, Palgrave Macmillan, 2012, ISBN 978-0-230-33895-1 and Fighting Back the Right: Reclaiming America from the Attack on Reason, Palgrave Macmillan, 2014, ISBN 978-1137279248
- Philippa Perry, psychotherapist, and author of Couch Fiction: A Graphic Tale of Psychotherapy
- Kenneth Roman, former CEO of Ogilvy & Mather Worldwide, the advertising agency founded by David Ogilvy, and author of The King of Madison Avenue
- Roger Scruton, philosopher, writer, activist and composer and author of The Palgrave Macmillan Dictionary of Political Thought
- Guy Spier, the author of The Education of a Value Investor
- Michael Szenberg, Professor of economics at Touro College, editor emeritus of The American Economist, and author of numerous books with Palgrave Macmillan.
- Mark Terry, professor, explorer, filmmaker, author of The Geo-Doc: Geomedia, Documentary Film and Social Change and Speaking Youth to Power: Influencing Climate Policy at the United Nations
- Rowan Williams, former Archbishop of Canterbury, author of Crisis and Recovery
- Tony Zinni, a retired four-star General in the United States Marine Corps and a former Commander in Chief of U.S. Central Command (CENTCOM), and the author of Leading the Charge
- Ghil'ad Zuckermann, linguist, revivalist and lexicologist, author of Language Contact and Lexical Enrichment in Israeli Hebrew (2003)
