= Sharon Krause =

American political philosopher and academic

- Born: 1966 (age 59–60)
- Awards: Spitz Prize

Education
- Education: Wellesley College (BA), Harvard Divinity School (MTS), Harvard University (PhD)

Philosophical work
- Era: 21st-century philosophy
- Region: Western philosophy
- Institutions: Brown University

Sharon R. Krause is an American political philosopher and William R. Kenan Jr. University Professor of Political Science at Brown University. She is a winner of the David and Elaine Spitz Prize for her book Civil Passions: Moral Sentiment and Democratic Deliberation.

== Books ==
- Eco-Emancipation (Princeton University Press, 2023)
- The Cambridge Companion to Montesquieu (Cambridge, 2023)
- Freedom Beyond Sovereignty (University of Chicago Press, 2015)
- Civil Passions: Moral Sentiment and Democratic Deliberation (Princeton University Press, 2008)
- Liberalism with Honor (Harvard University Press, 2002)
