= Richard Dagger =

American philosopher

- Awards: Spitz Prize

Education
- Education: University of Minnesota (PhD), University of Missouri-St. Louis (BA)

Philosophical work
- Era: 21st-century philosophy
- Region: Western philosophy
- Institutions: University of Richmond

Richard Dagger is an American political philosopher who is E. Claiborne Robins Distinguished Chair in the Liberal Arts, emeritus and Professor of Political Science and Philosophy, Politics, Economics and Law (PPEL) at the University of Richmond. He is known for his works on political theory. Dagger is a winner of the David and Elaine Spitz Prize for his book Civic Virtues: Rights, Citizenship, and Republican Liberalism.

== Books ==
- Playing Fair: Political Obligation and the Problems of Punishment, Oxford: Oxford University Press, 2018 (Oxford Studies in Penal Theory and Philosophy)
- Political Ideologies and the Democratic Ideal, with Terence Ball (Pearson, 2011, 8th ed.)
- Civic Virtues: Rights, Citizenship, and Republican Liberalism (Oxford University Press, 1997)
