= Recognition =

Recognition may refer to:

== Machine learning ==
- Pattern recognition, a branch of machine learning which encompasses the meanings below

=== Biometric ===
- Recognition of human individuals, or biometrics, used as a form of identification and access control
  - Facial recognition system, a system to identify individuals by their facial characteristics
  - Fingerprint recognition, automated method of verifying a match between two human fingerprints
  - Handwritten biometric recognition, identifies the author of specific handwriting, offline (static) or in real-time (dynamic)
  - Iris recognition, a method of biometric identification

=== Linguistic ===
- Language identification, the problem of identifying which natural language given content is in
- Natural language understanding, the parsing of the meaning of text
- Speech recognition, the conversion of spoken words into text
- Speaker recognition, the recognition of a speaker from their voice

=== Textual ===
- Handwriting recognition, the conversion of handwritten text into machine-encoded text
- Magnetic ink character recognition, used mainly by the banking industry
- Optical character recognition, the conversion of typewritten or printed text into machine-encoded text
  - Automatic number plate recognition, the use of optical character recognition to read vehicle registration plates

== Other meanings in computer science ==
- Activity recognition, the recognition of events from videos or sensors
- Gesture recognition, the interpretation of human gestures
- Named entity recognition, the classification of elements in text into predefined categories
- Object recognition
- Optical mark recognition, the capturing of human-marked data from document forms
- Sound recognition

== Neuroscience and psychology ==
- Visual object recognition
- Face perception, the process by which the human brain understands and interprets the face
- Pareidolia, a psychological phenomenon in which a vague stimulus is perceived as significant
- Recall (memory), the retrieval of events or information from the past
- Emotion recognition
- Pattern recognition (psychology)

== In other sciences ==
- Recognition (sociology), a public acknowledgement of person's status or merits
- Antigen recognition, in immunology
- Intra-species recognition, the recognition of another member of the same species
- Molecular recognition, the interaction between two or more molecules through non-covalent bonding

== Arts and entertainment ==
- "The Recognition", a science fiction short story by J. G. Ballard
- The Recognitions, a 1955 postmodernist novel by William Gaddis
- Recognition, an EP by The Europeans
- Recognise (album), a studio album by Fred V & Grafix, released in 2014
- "Recognise", a song by Lost Frequencies from the 2019 album Alive and Feeling Fine
- "Recognize" (song), a 2014 song by PartyNextDoor
- "Recognize", a song by Ol' Dirty Bastard from the 1999 album Nigga Please
- "Recognize", a song by DJ Snake from the 2019 album Carte Blanche

== Law ==
- Recognition (parliamentary procedure), the assignment of the floor
- Recognition (tax), an income tax concept
- Recognition (family law), a process in some jurisdictions that confers legitimacy on a child
- Diplomatic recognition, the acceptance of the sovereignty of a political entity
- Legal recognition, recognition of a legal right in a jurisdiction

== Other uses ==
- Recognise, a campaign by Reconciliation Australia for constitutional reform
- Aircraft recognition, the skill of identifying aircraft on sight
- Revenue recognition, in accrual accounting
