= Critical Review of International Social and Political Philosophy =

- Discipline: Philosophy
- Language: English
- Edited by: Richard P. Bellamy, Annabelle Lever, Glyn Morgan

Publication details
- History: 1998–present
- Publisher: Taylor & Francis
- Frequency: 7/year
- Impact factor: 0.8 (2022)

Standard abbreviations
- ISO 4: Crit. Rev. Int. Soc. Political Philos.

Indexing
- ISSN: 1369-8230 (print); 1743-8772 (web)

Critical Review of International Social and Political Philosophy (CRISPP) is a peer-reviewed academic journal which 'explores the normative assumptions and implications of current public policy issues and socio-political-legal processes.' The journal is indexed and abstracted in Political Science Abstracts, International Political Science Abstracts, Sociological Abstracts, Social Planning/Policy and Development Abstracts, CSA Political Science and Government and the Philosophers Index. Also included in Clarivate's Emerging Sources Citation Index, Political Science.
