= Mark Schroeder (philosopher) =

American philosopher

Mark Schroeder is an American philosopher whose scholarship focuses on metaethics, particularly expressivism and other forms of noncognitivism. He is a professor of philosophy at the University of Southern California, where he is currently director of the Conceptual Foundations of Conflict Project. He previously taught at the University of Maryland at College Park.

== Publications ==
- Schroeder, Mark (2007). Slaves of the Passions. Oxford University Press. doi:10.1093/acprof:oso/9780199299508.001.0001. ISBN 978-0-19-929950-8.
- Schroeder, Mark (2008). Being For: Evaluating the Semantic Program of Expressivism. Oxford University Press. doi:10.1093/acprof:oso/9780199534654.001.0001. ISBN 978-0-19-953465-4.
- Schroeder, Mark (2010). Noncognitivism in Ethics. Routledge. ISBN 978-0-415-77343-0. OCLC 166361330.
- Schroeder, Mark (2014). Explaining the Reasons We Share. Oxford University Press. doi:10.1093/acprof:oso/9780198713807.001.0001. ISBN 9780198713807.
- Schroeder, Mark (2015). Expressing Our Attitudes. Oxford University Press. doi:10.1093/acprof:oso/9780198714149.001.0001. ISBN 9780198714149.
- Howard, Nathan Robert; Schroeder, Mark (2024). The fundamentals of reasons. New York: Oxford University Press. ISBN 978-0-19-289627-8.
