= Other (philosophy) =

Concept in philosophy and psychology

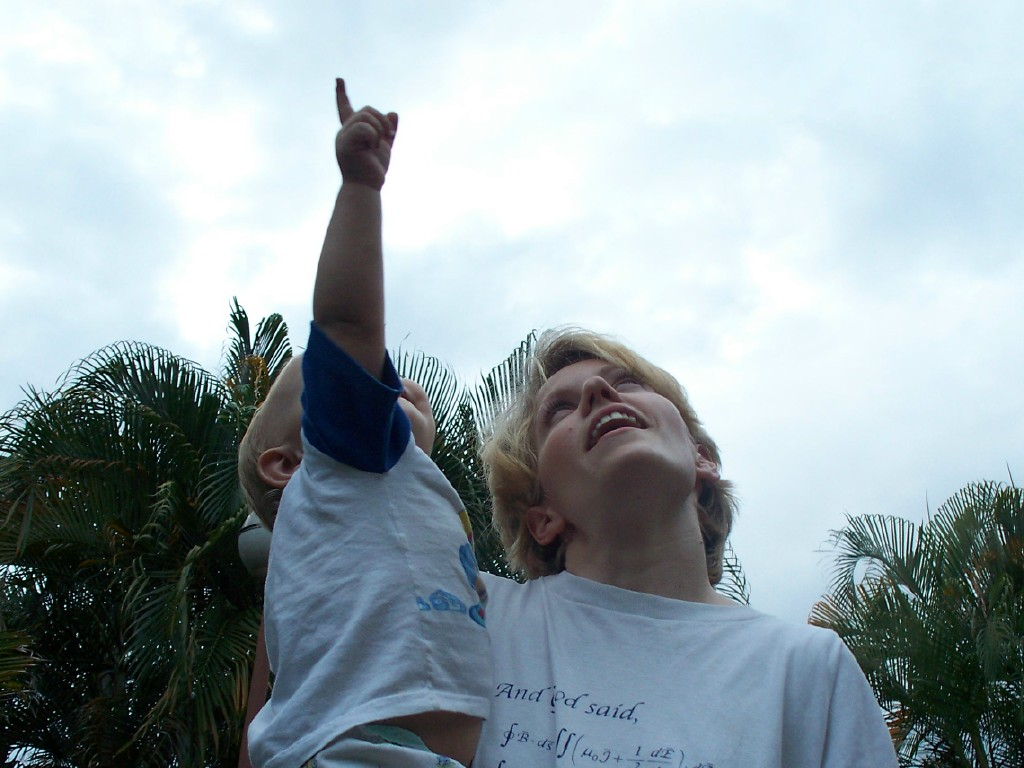
Raymond Tallis views the physical gesture of pointing as indicating "two kinds of beyond: the otherness of the world and the presence of other minds in the world." According to Jacques Lacan, the mother of an individual is their absolute other.

In philosophy, the other is a fundamental concept referring to anyone or anything perceived as distinct or different from oneself. This distinction is crucial for understanding how individuals construct their own identities, as the encounter with "otherness" helps define the boundaries of the self. In phenomenology, the other plays an important role in this self-formation, acting as a kind of mirror against which the self is reflected and understood.

The other is not simply a neutral observer but an active participant in shaping the individual's self-image. This includes the idea of the "constitutive other", which refers to the internal relationship between a person's essential nature (personality) and their physical embodiment (body), reflecting the interplay of internal differences within the self.

Beyond this individual level, the concept extends to broader social and political contexts. "otherness" describes the qualities and characteristics attributed to individuals or groups perceived as outside the dominant social norm. This can include differences based on race, ethnicity, gender, sexual orientation, religion, neurodivergence, disability or any other marker of social identity. The process of othering or otherizing involves labeling and defining individuals or groups as the other, often in ways that reinforce power imbalances and lead to marginalization, exclusion, and even discrimination. This act of othering can effectively place those deemed "different" at the margins of society, denying them full participation and access to resources. Therefore, the concept of the other is not just a philosophical abstraction but a powerful force shaping social relations and individual experiences.

== Background ==
=== Philosophy ===
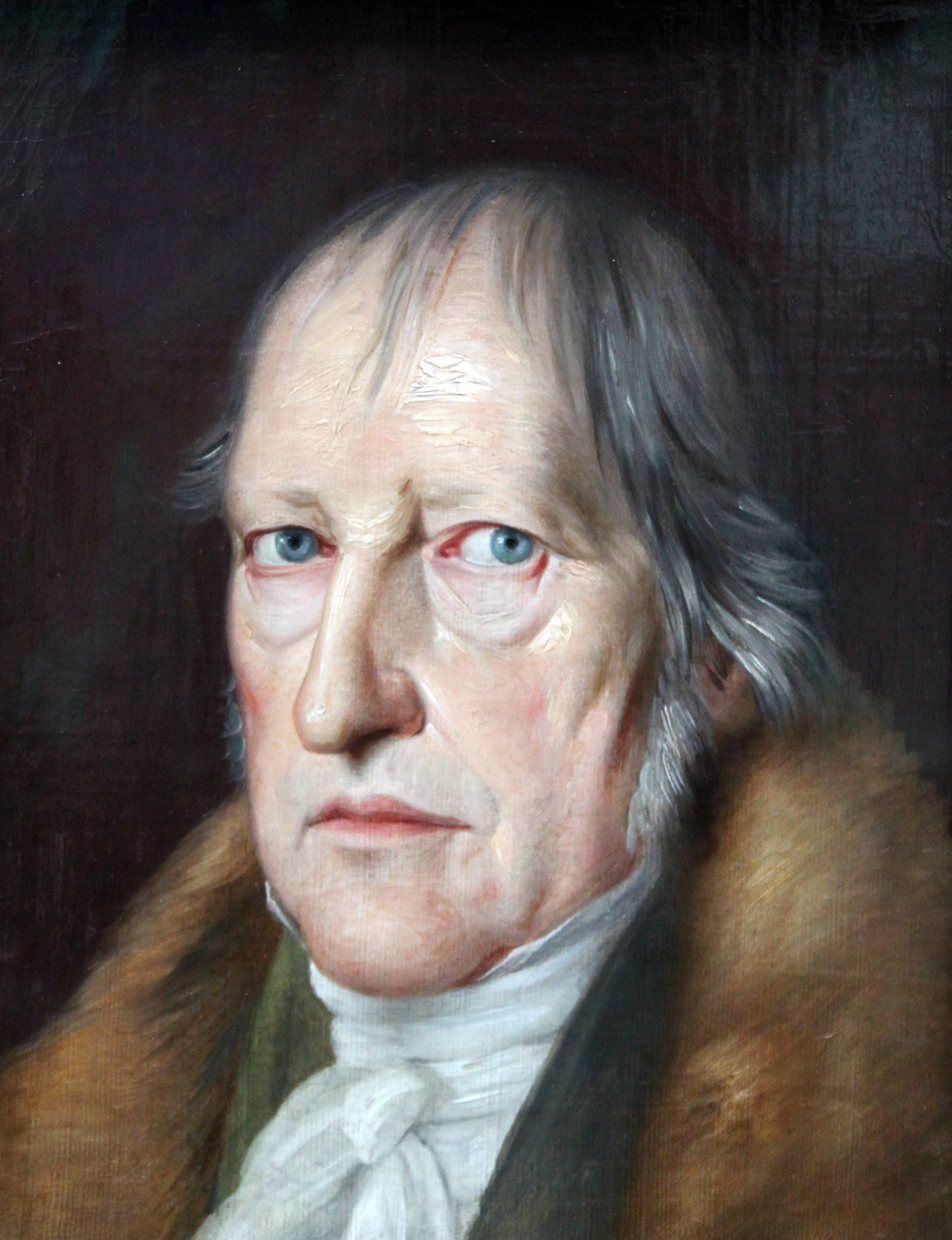
The idealist philosopher G. W. F. Hegel introduced the concept of the other as constituent part of human preoccupation with the self.

The concept of the self requires the existence of the constitutive other as the counterpart entity required for defining the self. Accordingly, in the late 18th century, Georg Wilhelm Friedrich Hegel (1770–1831) introduced the concept of the other as a constituent part of self-consciousness (preoccupation with the self), which complemented the propositions about self-awareness (capacity for introspection) proffered by Johann Gottlieb Fichte (1762–1814).

John Stuart Mill (1806–1873) introduced the idea of the other mind in 1865 in An Examination of Sir William Hamilton's Philosophy, the first formulation of the other after René Descartes (1596–1650).

Edmund Husserl (1859–1938) applied the concept of the other as the basis for intersubjectivity, the psychological relations among people. In Cartesian Meditations: An Introduction to Phenomenology (1931), Husserl said that the other is constituted as an alter ego, as an other self. As such, the other person posed and was an epistemological problem—of being only a perception of the consciousness of the self.

In Being and Nothingness: An Essay on Phenomenological Ontology (1943), Jean-Paul Sartre (1905–1980) applied the dialectic of intersubjectivity to describe how the world is altered by the appearance of the other, of how the world then appears to be oriented to the other person, and not to the self. The other appears as a psychological phenomenon in the course of a person's life, and not as a radical threat to the existence of the self. In that mode, in The Second Sex (1949), Simone de Beauvoir (1908–1986) applied the concept of otherness to Hegel's dialectic of the "Lord and Bondsman" (Herrschaft und Knechtschaft, 1807) and found it to be like the dialectic of the man–woman relationship, thus a true explanation for society's treatment and mistreatment of women.

The question of why one exists as themselves and not as someone else has been called the vertiginous question by Benj Hellie, and the "even harder problem of consciousness" by Tim S. Roberts. Various philosophers have argued that the existence of first-person perspectives has a number of philosophical implications. Christian List argues that first-person perspectives are evidence against physicalism, and evidence against reality being metaphysically united. Vincent Conitzer argues for a connection between the existence of the self and A series and B series theories of time. Egocentric presentism and perspectival realism are ideas posed by Caspar Hare that posit that first-person perspectives imply a weak form of solipsism. Japanese philosopher Hitoshi Nagai has used the concept of first person perspectives as a way of defining the self, defining the self as the "one who directly experiences the consciousness of oneself".

Daniel Kolak argues that the entire concept of the "self" being distinct from the "other" is incoherent. In his book I am You, Kolak uses the terms "closed individualism", "empty individualism", and "open individualism" to describe three contrasting philosophical views of the self. Kolak argues that closed individualism, the idea that one's personal identity consist of a line persisting from moment to moment, is incoherent, and there is no basis for the belief in a future self and that one is the "same" person from moment to moment. Empty individualism is the idea that personal identity exists, but one's identity only exists as a "time slice" existing for an infinitesimally small amount of time. Open individualism is the view advocated by Kolak, in which the self in reality does not actually exist at all, similar to anattā in Buddhist philosophy. Derek Parfit makes similar arguments in his book Reasons and Persons, in which he argues that the teletransportation paradox challenges the notion of a continuous personal identity.

Amartya Sen describes othering as a process involving out-group homogeneity, in which "[i]ndividual victim personality, behavior, beliefs, patriotism, or service to the nation are all largely irrelevant. Complex individuals are reduced to a single identity and category that is used to define them in total ... . They belong to a group that has been scapegoated for societal problems, defined as posing a threat, or portrayed as being subhuman and all members share in that collective identity and responsibility."

=== Psychology ===
The psychoanalyst Jacques Lacan (1901–1981) and the philosopher of ethics Emmanuel Levinas (1906–1995) established the contemporary definitions, usages, and applications of the constitutive other, as the radical counterpart of the self. Lacan associated the other with language and with the symbolic order of things. Levinas associated the other with the ethical metaphysics of scripture and tradition; The ethical proposition is that the other is superior and prior to the self.

In a seminar on psychoanalysis, Lacan introduced the concept of mother being the absolute other of an individual. Levinas re-formulated the face-to-face encounter (wherein a person is morally responsible to the other person) to include the propositions of Jacques Derrida (1930–2004) about the impossibility of the other (person) being an entirely metaphysical pure-presence. That the other could be an entity of pure otherness (of alterity) personified in a representation created and depicted with language that identifies, describes, and classifies. The conceptual re-formulation of the nature of the other also included Levinas's analysis of the distinction between "the saying and the said"; nonetheless, the nature of the other retained the priority of ethics over metaphysics.

In the psychology of the mind (e.g. R. D. Laing), the other identifies and refers to the unconscious mind, to silence, to insanity, and to language ("to what is referred and to what is unsaid"). Nonetheless, in such psychologic and analytic usages, there might arise a tendency to relativism if the other person (as a being of pure, abstract alterity) leads to ignoring the commonality of truth. Likewise, problems arise from unethical usages of the terms the other, otherness, and othering to reinforce ontological divisions of reality: of being, of becoming, and of existence.

=== Ethics ===
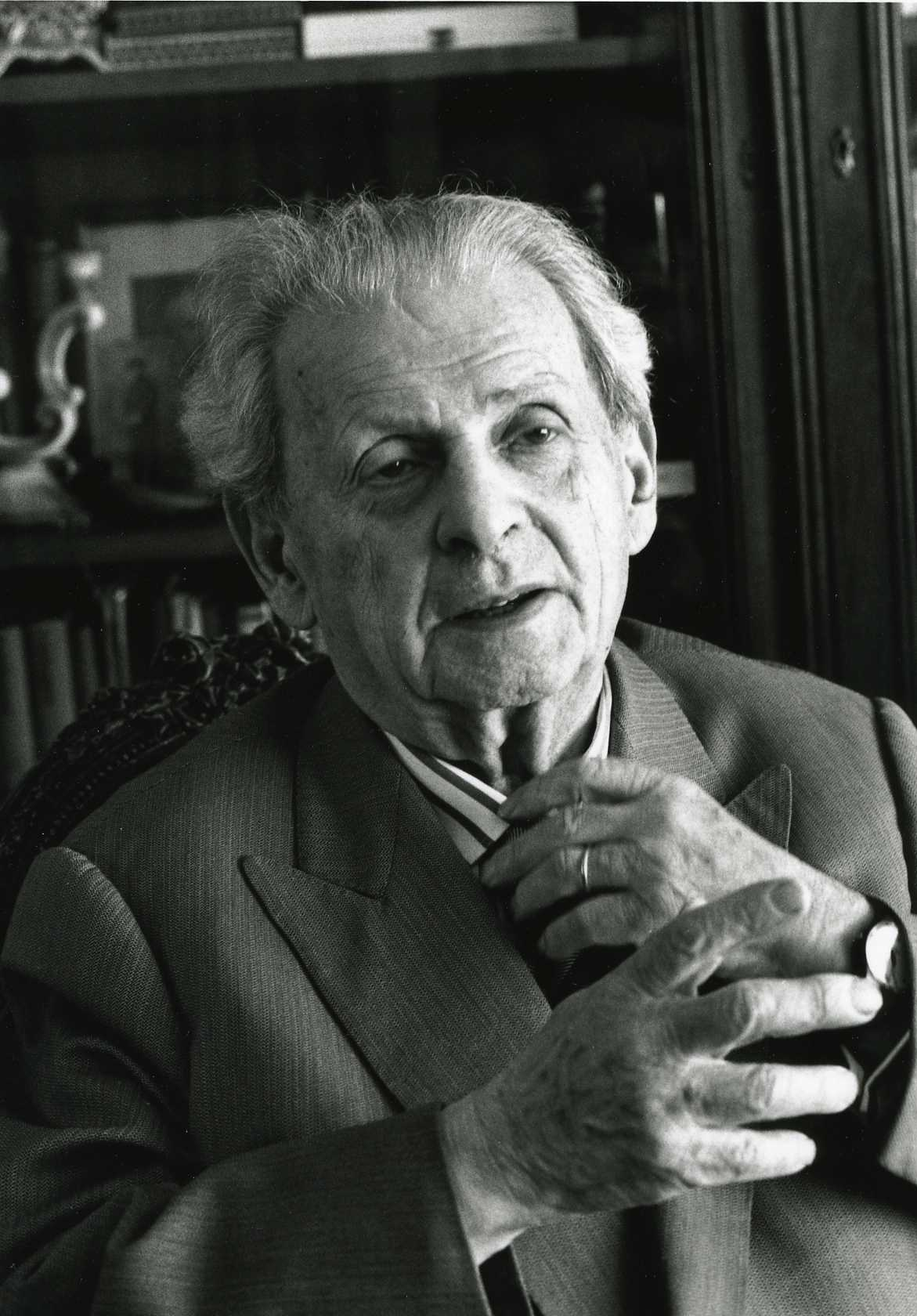
The philosopher of ethics Emmanuel Lévinas said that the infinite demand the other places on the self makes ethics the foundation of human existence and philosophy.

In Totality and Infinity: An Essay on Exteriority (1961), Emmanuel Lévinas said that previous philosophy had reduced the constitutive other to an object of consciousness, by not preserving its absolute alterity—the innate condition of otherness, by which the other radically transcends the self and the totality of the human network, into which the other is being placed. As a challenge to self-assurance, the existence of the other is a matter of ethics, because the ethical priority of the other equals the primacy of ethics over ontology in real life.

From that perspective, Lévinas described the nature of the other as "insomnia and wakefulness"; an ecstasy (an exteriority) towards the other that forever remains beyond any attempt at fully capturing the other, whose otherness is infinite; even in the murder of an other, the otherness of the person remains uncontrolled and not negated. The infinity of the other allowed Lévinas to derive other aspects of philosophy and science as secondary to that ethic; thus:

The others that obsess me in the Other do not affect me as examples of the same genus united with my neighbor, by resemblance or common nature, individuations of the human race, or chips off the old block. ... The others concern me from the first. Here, fraternity precedes the commonness of a genus. My relationship with the Other as neighbor gives meaning to my relations with all the others.—Otherwise than Being, or Beyond Essence

=== Critical theory ===
Jacques Derrida said that the absolute alterity of the other is compromised, because the other person is other than the self and the group. The logic of alterity (otherness) is especially negative in the realm of human geography, wherein the native other is denied ethical priority as a person with the right to participate in the geopolitical discourse with an empire who decides the colonial fate of the homeland of the other. In that vein, the language of otherness used in Oriental studies perpetuates the cultural perspective of the dominator–dominated relation, which is characteristic of hegemony; likewise, the sociologic misrepresentation of the feminine as the sexual other to man reasserts male privilege as the primary voice in social discourse between women and men.

In The Colonial Present: Afghanistan, Palestine and Iraq (2004), the geographer Derek Gregory said that the US government's ideologic answers to questions about reasons for the terrorist attacks against the U.S. (i.e. 11 September 2001) reinforced the imperial purpose of the negative representations of the Middle-Eastern other; especially when President G. W. Bush (2001–2009) rhetorically asked: "Why do they hate us?" as political prelude to the war on terror (2001). Bush's rhetorical interrogation of armed resistance to empire, by the non–Western other, produced an Us-and-Them mentality in American relations with the non-white peoples of the Middle East; hence, as foreign policy, the war on terror is fought for control of imaginary geographies, which originated from the fetishised cultural representations of the other invented by Orientalists; the cultural critic Edward Saïd said that:

To build a conceptual framework around a notion of Us-versus-Them is, in effect, to pretend that the principal consideration is epistemological and natural—our civilization is known and accepted, theirs is different and strange—whereas, in fact, the framework separating us from them is belligerent, constructed, and situational.

— The Colonial Present: Afghanistan, Palestine and Iraq (2004), p. 24.

== Imperialism and colonialism ==
The contemporary, post-colonial world system of nation-states (with interdependent politics and economies) was preceded by the European imperial system of economic and settler colonies in which "the creation and maintenance of an unequal economic, cultural, and territorial relationship, usually between states, and often in the form of an empire, [was] based on domination and subordination." In the imperialist world system, political and economic affairs were fragmented, and the discrete empires "provided for most of their own needs ... [and disseminated] their influence solely through conquest [empire] or the threat of conquest [hegemony]."

=== Racism ===
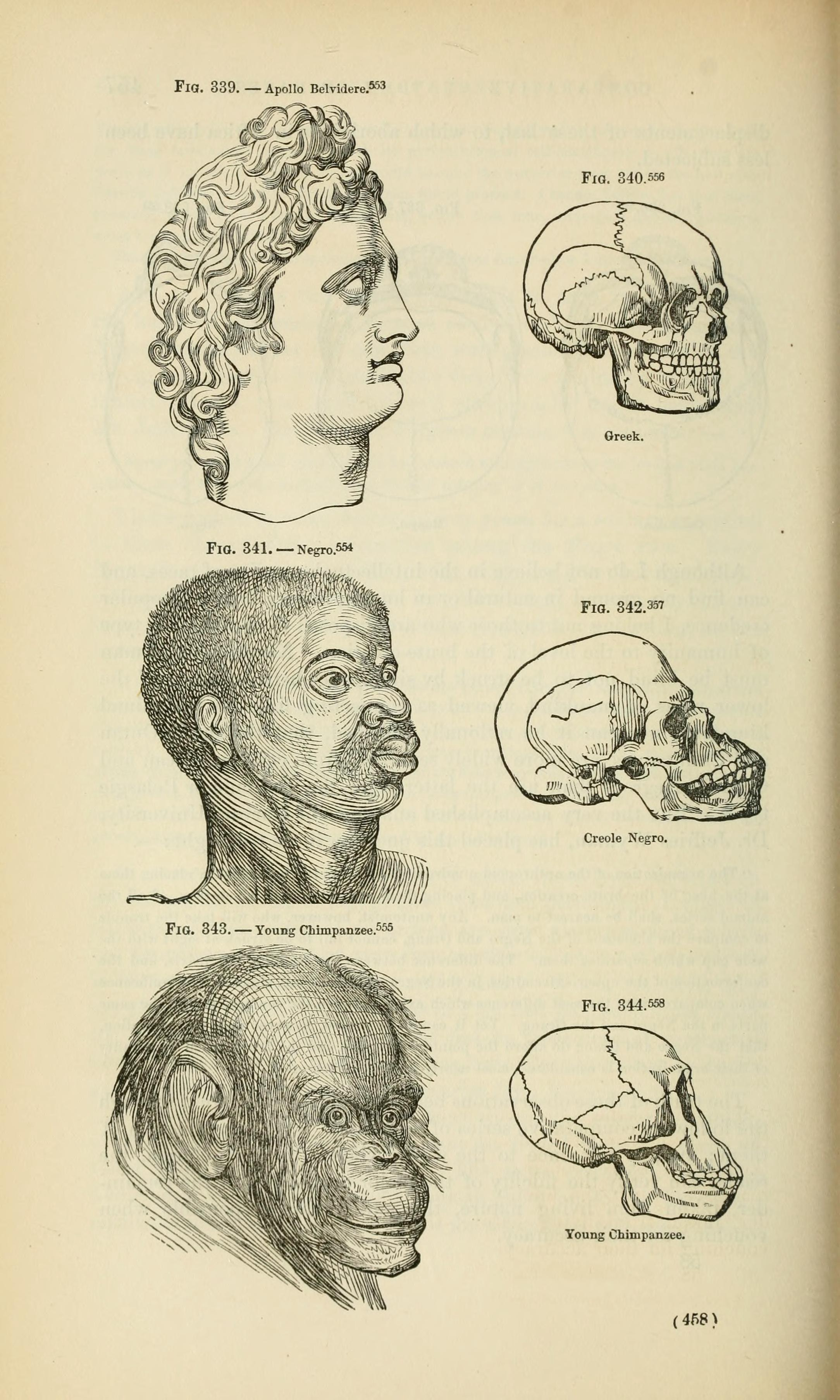
A manifestation of the other in the form of scientific racism: In this 1857 illustration from his work Indigenous Races of the Earth, anthropologist Josiah C. Nott justified anti-Black racism by claiming that the features of African-Americans had more in common with chimpanzees than humans in comparison to white people.

The racialist perspective of the Western world during the 18th and 19th centuries was invented with the othering of non-white peoples, which also was supported by the fabrications of scientific racism, such as the pseudo-science of phrenology, which claimed that, in relation to a white-man's head, the head-size of the non-European other indicated inferior intelligence; e.g. the apartheid-era cultural representations of coloured people in South Africa (1948–94).

With documents such as The Race Question (1950) and the Declaration on the Elimination of All Forms of Racial Discrimination (1963), the United Nations officially declared that 'race' is "not so much a biological phenomenon" and that the word is often misused to refer to national, religious, linguistic, or cultural groups — categories that have no genetic basis. It recommended replacing the term "race" with "ethnic groups" to avoid confusion.

Despite the United Nations' dismissal of racialism, institutional othering in the United States can operate through contested legal and political terminology that sorts people on the move into binaries such as "citizen/noncitizen", "legal/illegal", and "migrant/refugee".

=== Orientalism ===
To European people, imperialism (military conquest of non-white people, annexation, and economic integration of their countries to the motherland) was intellectually justified by (among other reasons) orientalism, the study and fetishization of the Eastern world as "primitive peoples" requiring modernisation, the civilising mission. Colonial empires were justified and realised with essentialist and reductive representations (of people, places, and cultures) in books and pictures and fashion, which conflated different cultures and peoples into the binary relation of the Orient and the Occident. Orientalism created the artificial existence of the Western self and the non–Western other. Orientalists rationalised the cultural artifice of a difference of essence between white and non-white peoples to fetishize (identify, classify, subordinate) the peoples and cultures of Asia into "the Oriental other"—who exists in opposition to the Western self. As a function of imperial ideology, Orientalism fetishizes people and things in three actions of cultural imperialism: (i) Homogenization (all Oriental peoples are one folk); (ii) Feminization (the Oriental always is subordinate in the East–West relation); and (iii) Essentialization (a people possess universal characteristics); thus established by othering, the empire's cultural hegemony reduces to inferiority the people, places, and things of the Eastern world, as measured against the West, the standard of superior civilisation.

The related term "governable otherness" has been applied in material culture studies to describe the manner in which a dominant sedentary empire in Eurasian Antiquity (e.g. China, Persia, or Greece) strategically borrowed elements from the aesthetic systems of their non-sedentary neighbors and physically delimited them into a much grander, local frame to showcase control over seemingly unconquerable domains. The aesthetic reference to the "barbaric other" of the far-flung periphery was always overshadowed by the framing and governing entity.

=== Subaltern native ===
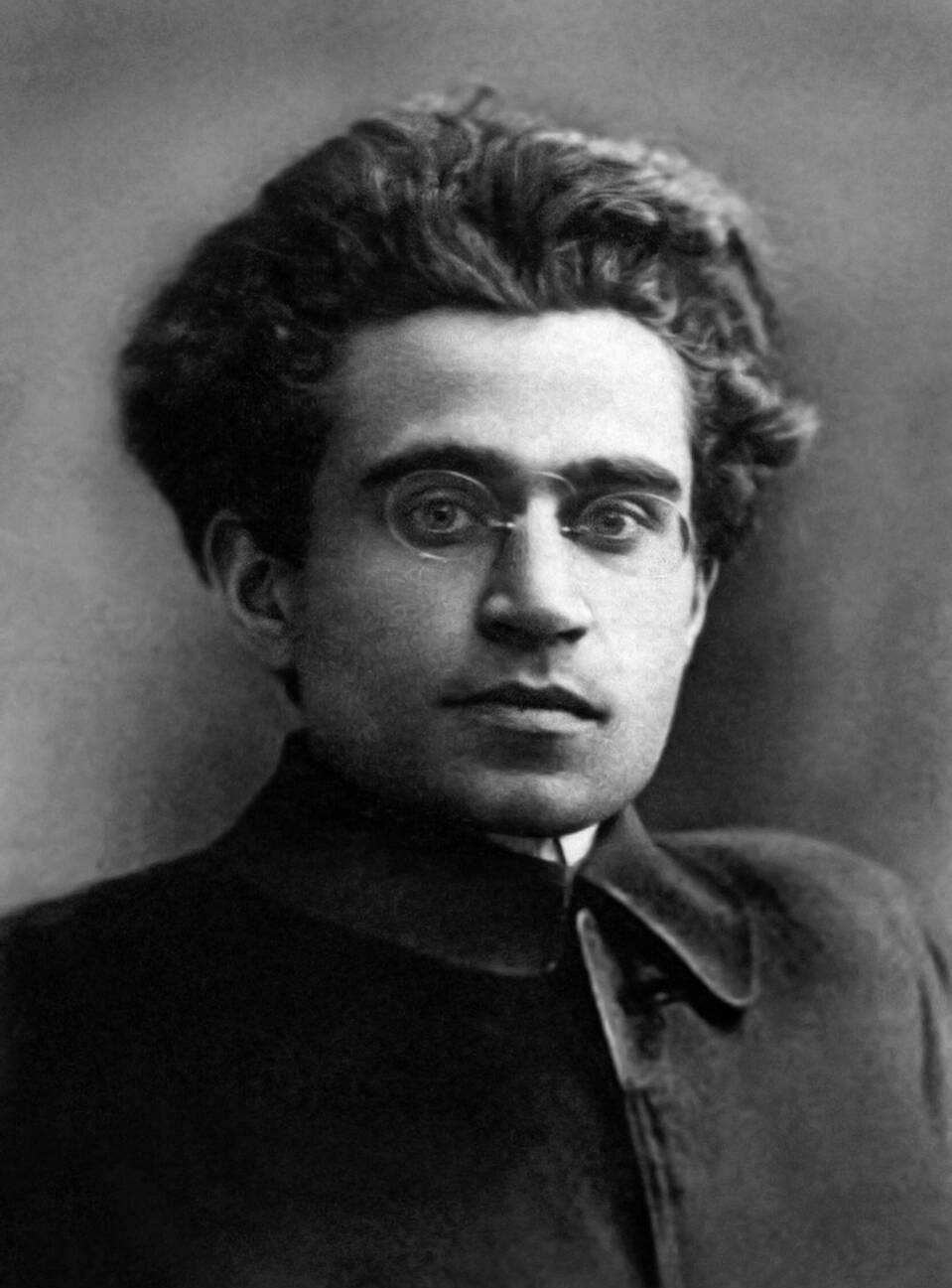
The subaltern native is a colonial identity for the other, which conceptually derives from the cultural hegemony work of Antonio Gramsci, an Italian Marxist intellectual.

Colonial stability requires the cultural subordination of the non-white other for transformation into the subaltern native; a colonised people who facilitate the exploitation of their labour, of their lands, and of the natural resources of their country. The practise of othering justifies the physical domination and cultural subordination of the native people by degrading them—first from being a national-citizen to being a colonial-subject—and then by displacing them to the periphery of the colony, and of geopolitical enterprise that is imperialism.

Using the false dichotomy of "colonial strength" (imperial power) against "native weakness" (military, social, and economic), the coloniser invents the non-white other in an artificial dominator-dominated relationship that can be resolved only through racialist noblesse oblige, the "moral responsibility" that psychologically allows the colonialist self to believe that imperialism is a civilising mission to educate, convert, and then culturally assimilate the other into the empire—thus transforming the "civilised" other into the self.

In establishing a colony, othering a non-white people allowed the colonisers to physically subdue and "civilise" the natives to establish the hierarchies of domination (political and social) required for exploiting the subordinated natives and their country. As a function of empire, a settler colony is an economic means for profitably disposing of two demographic groups: (i) the colonists (surplus population of the motherland) and (ii) the colonised (the subaltern native to be exploited) who antagonistically define and represent the other as separate and apart from the colonial self.

Othering establishes unequal relationships of power between the colonised natives and the colonisers, who believe themselves essentially superior to the natives whom they othered into racial inferiority, as the non-white other. That dehumanisation maintains the false binary-relations of social class, caste, and race, of sex and gender, and of nation and religion. The profitable functioning of a colony (economic or settler) requires continual protection of the cultural demarcations that are basic to the unequal socio-economic relation between the "civilised man" (the colonist) and the "savage man", thus the transformation of the other into the colonial subaltern.

== Gender and sex ==
=== LGBT identities ===
The social exclusion function of othering a person or a social group from mainstream society to the social margins—for being essentially different from the societal norm (the plural self)—is a socio-economic function of gender. In a society wherein man–woman heterosexuality is the sexual norm, the other refers to and identifies lesbians (women who love women) and gay men (men who love men) as people of same-sex orientation whom society has othered as "sexually deviant" from the norms of binary-gender heterosexuality. In practice, sexual othering is realised by applying the negative denotations and connotations of the terms that describe lesbian, gay, bisexual, and transgender people, in order to diminish their personal social status and political power, and so displace their LGBT communities to the legal margin of society. To neutralise such cultural othering, LGBT communities queer a city by creating social spaces that use the spatial and temporal plans of the city to allow the LGBT communities free expression of their social identities, e.g. a boystown, a gay-pride parade, etc.; as such, queering urban spaces is a political means for the non-binary sexual other to establish themselves as citizens integral to the reality (cultural and socio-economic) of their city's body politic.

=== Woman as identity ===
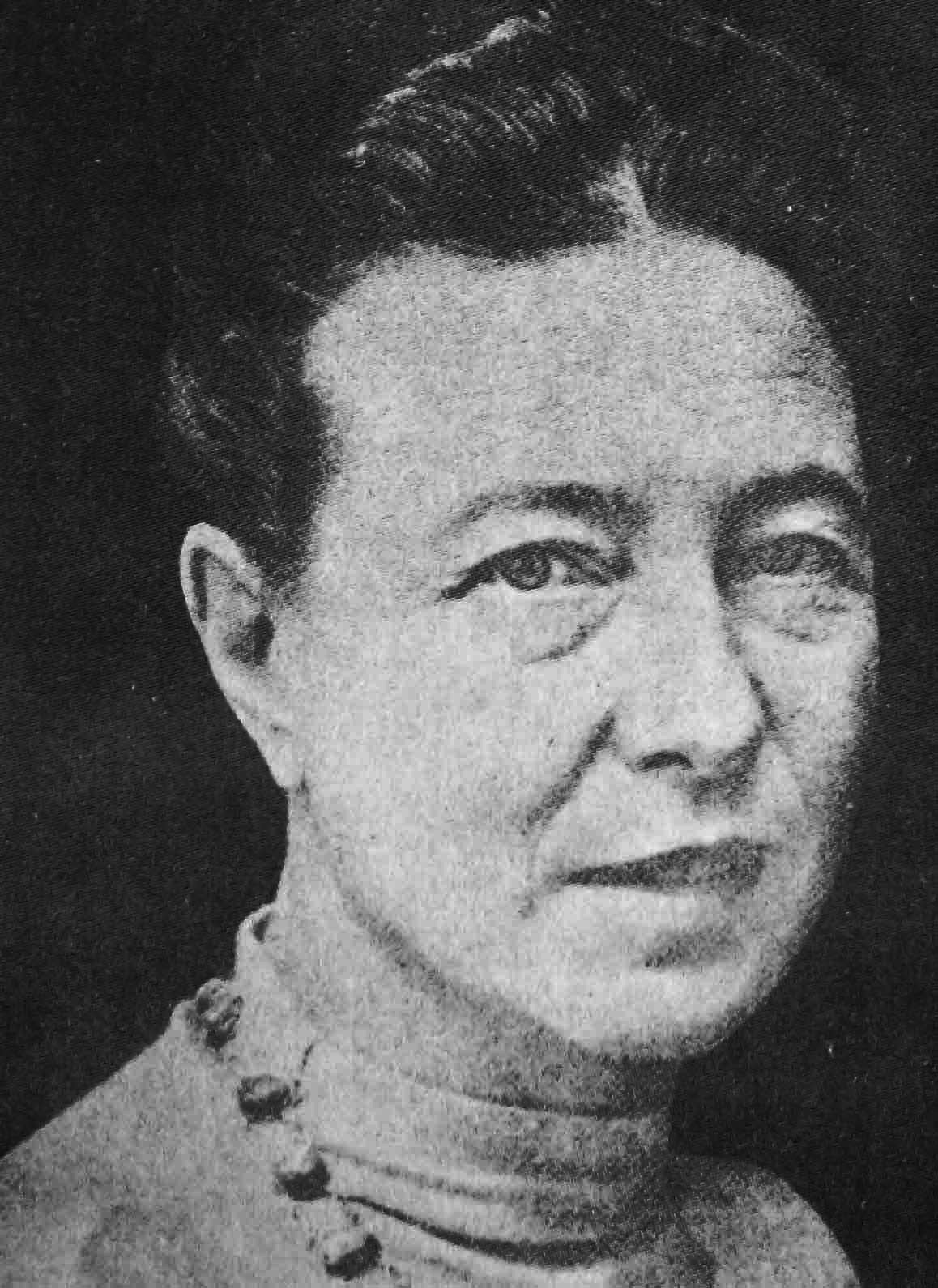
The philosopher of existentialism Simone de Beauvoir developed the concept of the other to explain the workings of the man–woman binary gender relation, as a critical base of the dominator–dominated relation, which characterises sexual inequality between men and women.

The feminist philosopher Cheshire Calhoun identified the female other as the female-half of the binary-gender relation that is the man and woman relation. The deconstruction of the word woman (the subordinate party in the man and woman relation) produced a conceptual reconstruction of the female other as the woman who exists independently of male definition, as rationalised by patriarchy. That the female other is a self-aware woman who is autonomous and independent of the patriarchy's formal subordination of the female sex with the institutional limitations of social convention, tradition, and customary law; the social subordination of women is communicated (denoted and connoted) in the sexist usages of the word woman.

In 1949, the existentialist philosopher Simone de Beauvoir applied Hegel's conception of "the other" (as a constituent part of self-awareness) to describe a male-dominated culture that represents woman as the sexual other to man. In a patriarchal culture, the man–woman relation is society's normative binary-gender relation, wherein the sexual other is a social minority with the least socio-political agency, usually the women of the community, because patriarchal semantics established that "a man represents both the positive and the neutral, as indicated by the common use of [the word] man to designate human beings in general; whereas [the word] woman represents only the negative, defined by limiting criteria, without reciprocity" from the first sex, from man.

In 1957, Betty Friedan reported that a woman's social identity is formally established by the sexual politics of the ordinate–subordinate nature of the man–woman sexual relation, the social norm in the patriarchal West. When queried about their post-graduate lives, the majority of women interviewed at a university-class reunion, used binary gender language, and referred to and identified themselves by their social roles (wife, mother, lover) in the private sphere of life; and did not identify themselves by their own achievements (job, career, business) in the public sphere of life. Unawares, the women had acted conventionally, and automatically identified and referred to themselves as the social other to men.

Although the nature of the social other is influenced by the society's social constructs (social class, sex, gender), as a human organisation, society holds the socio-political power to formally change the social relation between the male-defined self and woman, the sexual other, who is not male.

In feminist definition, women are the other to men (but not the other proposed by Hegel) and are not existentially defined by masculine demands; and also are the social other who unknowingly accepts social subjugation as part of subjectivity, because the gender identity of woman is constitutionally different from the gender identity of man. The harm of othering is in the asymmetric nature of unequal roles in sexual and gender relations; the inequality arises from the social mechanics of intersubjectivity.

== Knowledge ==
=== Cultural representations ===
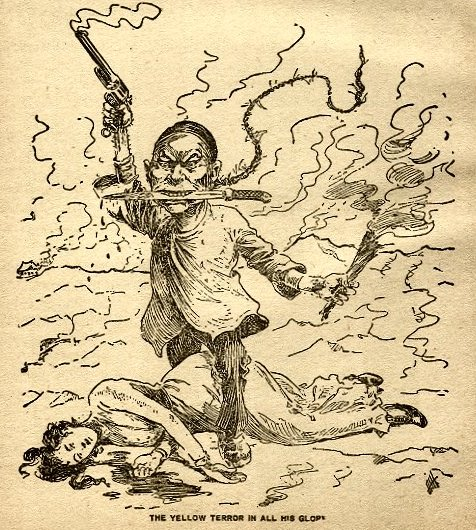
The Yellow Terror in all His Glory, an 1899 editorial cartoon depicting a Chinese man standing over a fallen white woman. The Chinese man, the "other", represents the Boxer movement and the woman represents Christian Europeans.

About the production of knowledge of the other who is not the self, the philosopher Michel Foucault said that othering is the creation and maintenance of imaginary "knowledge of the other"—which comprises cultural representations in service to socio-political power and the establishment of hierarchies of domination. That cultural representations of the other (as a metaphor, as a metonym, and as an anthropomorphism) are manifestations of the xenophobia inherent to the European historiographies that defined and labelled non–European peoples as the other who is not the European self. Supported by the reductive discourses (academic and commercial, geopolitical and military) of the empire's dominant ideology, the colonialist misrepresentations of the other explain the Eastern world to the Western world as a binary relation of native weakness against colonial strength.

In the 19th-century historiographies of the Orient as a cultural region, the Orientalists studied only what they said was the high culture (languages and literatures, arts and philologies) of the Middle East, but did not study that geographic space as a place inhabited by different nations and societies. About that Western version of the Orient, Edward Saïd said that:

the Orient that appears in Orientalism, then, is a system of representations framed by a whole set of forces that brought the Orient into Western learning, Western consciousness, and later, Western empire. If this definition of Orientalism seems more political than not, that is simply because I think Orientalism was, itself, a product of certain political forces and activities.

Orientalism is a school of interpretation whose material happens to be the Orient, its civilisations, peoples, and localities. Its objective discoveries – the work of innumerable devoted scholars who edited texts and translated them, codified grammars, wrote dictionaries, reconstructed dead epochs, produced positivistically verifiable learning – are and always have been conditioned by the fact that its truths, like any truths delivered by language, are embodied in language, and, what is the truth of language?, Nietzsche once said, but "a mobile army of metaphors, metonyms, and anthropomorphisms – in short, a sum of human relations, which have been enhanced, transposed, and embellished poetically and rhetorically, and which, after long use, seem firm, canonical, and obligatory to a people: truths are illusions about which one has forgotten that this is what they are."

— Orientalism (1978) pp. 202–203.

In so far as the Orient occurred in the existential awareness of the Western world, as a term, The Orient later accrued many meanings and associations, denotations, and connotations that did not refer to the real peoples, cultures, and geography of the Eastern world, but to Oriental studies, the academic field about the Orient as a word.

=== Academia ===
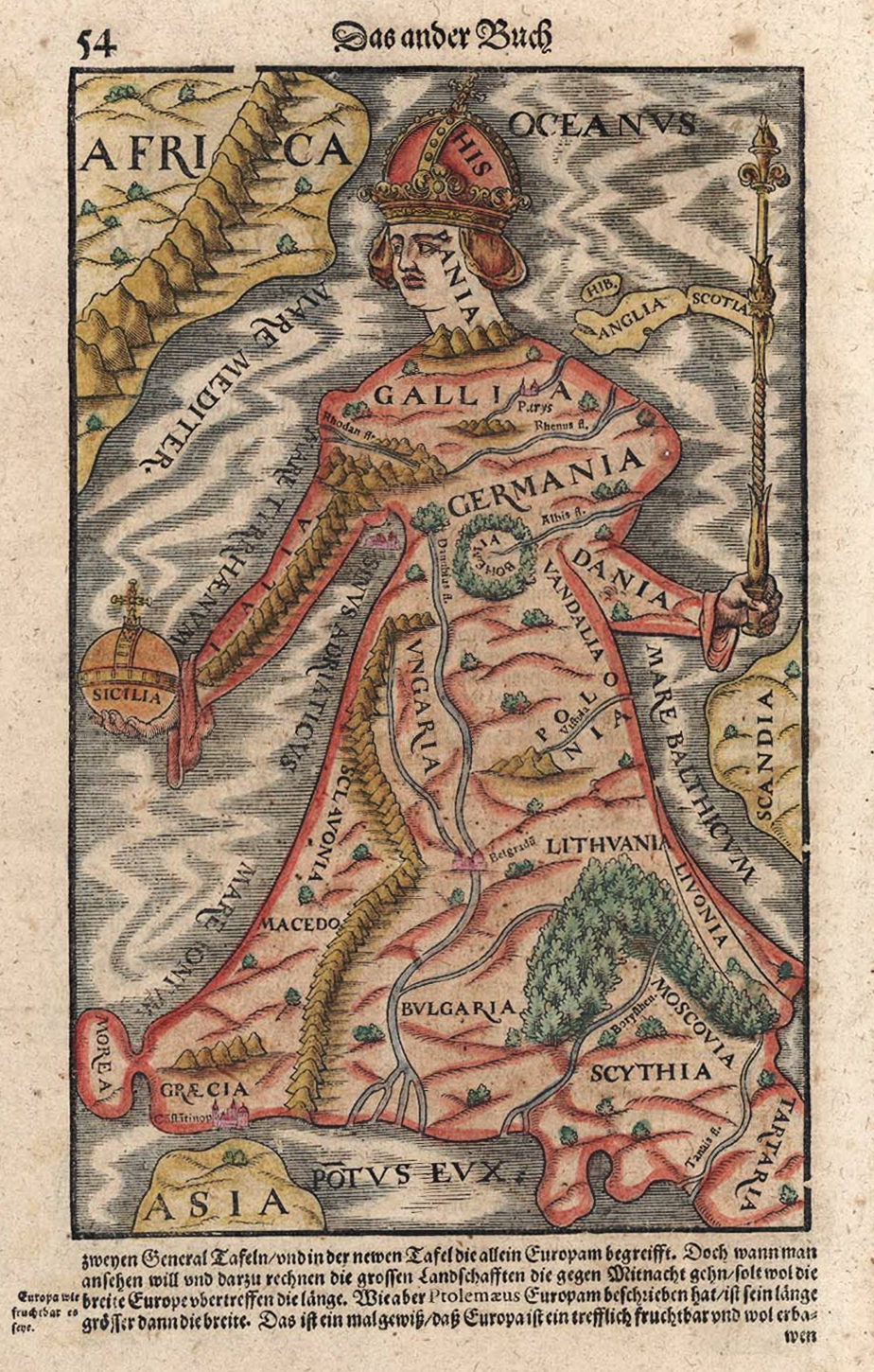
In "Cosmographia" (1570), by Sebastian Münster, "Europa regina" is the cartographic centre of the world.

In the Eastern world, the field of Occidentalism, the investigation programme and academic curriculum of and about the essence of the West—Europe as a culturally homogeneous place—did not exist as a counterpart to Orientalism. In the postmodern era, the Orientalist practices of historical negationism, the writing of distorted histories about the places and peoples of "the East", continues in contemporary journalism; e.g. in the Third World, political parties practice othering with fabricated facts about threat-reports and non-existent threats (political, social, military) that are meant to politically delegitimise opponent political parties composed of people from the social and ethnic groups designated as the other in that society.

The othering of a person or of a social group—by means of an ideal ethnocentricity (the ethnic group of the self) that evaluates and assigns negative, cultural meaning to the ethnic other—is realised through cartography; hence, the maps of Western cartographers emphasised and bolstered artificial representations of the national-identities, the natural resources, and the cultures of the native inhabitants, as culturally inferior to the West.

Historically, Western cartography often featured distortions (proportionate, proximate, and commercial) of places and true distances by placing the cartographer's homeland in the centre of the mapamundi; these ideas were often utilized to support imperialistic expansion. In contemporary cartography, the polar-perspective maps of the Northern Hemisphere, drawn by U.S. cartographers, also frequently feature distorted spatial relations (distance, size, mass) of and between the U.S. and Russia which according to historian Jerome D. Fellman emphasise the perceived inferiority (military, cultural, geopolitical) of the Russian other.

=== Practical perspectives ===
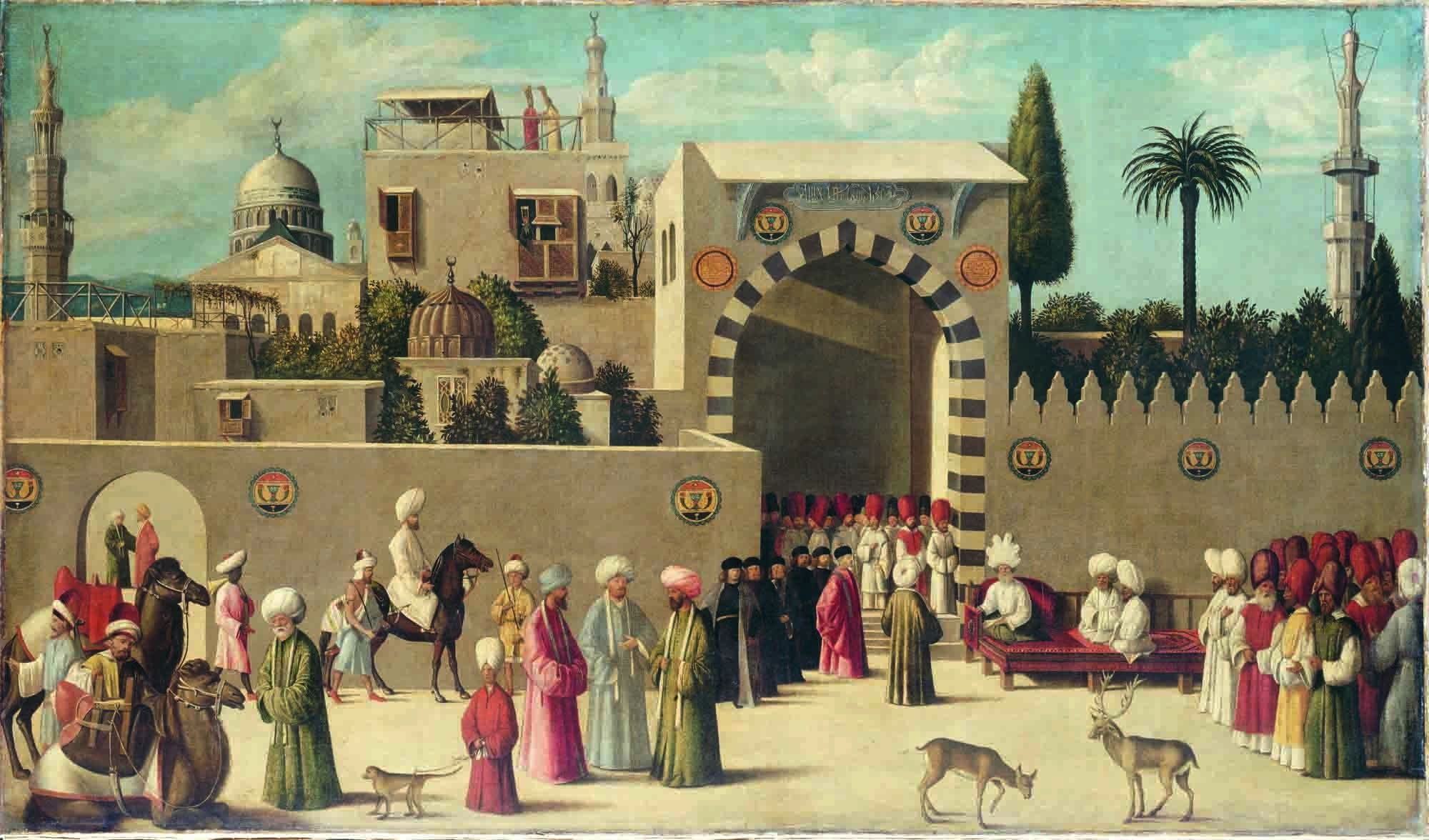
Orientalist art: The Reception of the Ambassadors in Damascus (1511) features wildlife (the deer in the foreground) that is not native to Syria.

In Key Concepts in Political Geography (2009), Alison Mountz proposed concrete definitions of the other as a philosophic concept and as a term within phenomenology; as a noun, the other identifies and refers to a person and to a group of persons; as a verb, the other identifies and refers to a category and a label for persons and things.

Post-colonial scholarship demonstrated that, in pursuit of empire, "the colonizing powers narrated an 'Other' whom they set out to save, dominate, control, [and] civilize ... [in order to] extract resources through colonization" of the country whose people the colonial power designated as the Other. As facilitated by Orientalist representations of the non–Western other, colonization—the economic exploitation of a people and their land—is misrepresented as a civilizing mission launched for the material, cultural, and spiritual benefit of the colonized peoples.

Counter to the post-colonial perspective of the other as part of dominator–dominated binary relationship, postmodern philosophy presents the other and otherness as phenomenological and ontological progress for man and Society. Public knowledge of the social identity of peoples classified as "outsiders" is de facto acknowledgement of their being real, thus they are part of the body politic, especially in the cities. As such, "the post-modern city is a geographical celebration of difference that moves sites once conceived of as 'marginal' to the [social] centre of discussion and analysis" of the human relations between the outsiders and the establishment.

== See also ==
- Ableism
- Allophilia
- Allosemitism
- Alterity
- Caste system in India
- Dissociative identity disorder
- Exoticism
- Generalized other
- Identity politics
- Kyriarchy
- Markedness
- Marx's theory of alienation
- Open individualism
- Otherness of childhood
- Pseudospeciation
- Role suction
- Social alienation
- Vertiginous question
- Xenocentrism

=== Books ===
- The Wretched of the Earth (1961), by Frantz Fanon
- The Other (2006), by Ryszard Kapuściński
- Orientalism (1978), by Edward Said

=== Films ===
- The Other (1972), based on the novel by Thomas Tryon

=== Sexual difference ===
- Judith Butler
- Julia Kristeva
- Luce Irigaray
- Sarojini Sahoo
