= Cratylus =

Ancient Greek philosopher

Cratylus (/ˈkrætɪləs/ KRAT-il-əs; Ancient Greek: Κρατύλος, Kratylos) was an ancient Athenian philosopher from the mid-late 5th century BC, known mostly through his portrayal in Plato's dialogue Cratylus. He was a radical proponent of Heraclitean philosophy and influenced the young Plato.

== Life ==
Little is known of Cratylus beyond his status as a disciple of Heraclitus of Ephesus, Asia Minor. Modern biographers have not reached consensus on his approximate date of birth, arguing alternately for an age comparable either to Plato or Socrates. Cratylus is mentioned in Aristotle's Metaphysics in a passage that seemingly implies he was an established and active philosopher in Athens during the mid-late 5th century, and that Plato was briefly interested in his teachings prior to aligning with Socrates.

== Philosophy ==
In Cratylus' eponymous Platonic dialogue, the character of Socrates states Heraclitus' claim that one cannot step twice into the same stream. According to Aristotle, Cratylus went a step beyond his master's doctrine and proclaimed that it cannot even be done once.

== Influence ==
The contemporary philosophy Cratylism is based on a reconstructed version of Cratylus' theories of flux and language as they appear in Plato's dialogue. It has been influential to Eastern thinkers, including Buddhist semioticians. The Australian poet, academic, and literary critic A. D. Hope published a book of essays on poetry in 1979 entitled The New Cratylus.

Cratylus is mentioned twice in Emmanuel Levinas's 1961 book, Totality and Infinity.

== See also ==
- List of speakers in Plato's dialogues
