= Meontology =

Philosophy concerned with the nature of nothingness

In philosophy, meontology (from Ancient Greek μή, me "non" and ὄν, on "being" (see ontology)) is the concept of non-being, an attempt to cover what may remain outside of ontology. French philosopher Jean-Luc Nancy distinguishes it as nothingness, as opposed to nothing.

== In Levinas ==
For Emmanuel Levinas, meontology was whatever had meaning beyond ontology, the ethical primary demand of the other in a face-to-face encounter. According to Levinas, meontology refers not to another being but to an inability to be that leads to a transcendent realm "other than being". However, Levinas suggested that meontology, as the mirror image of ontology, occupies the same logical space. Levinas' conceptualization is encapsulated in a principle for existence or for humanity that states, "Do not go inside, go outside!". It implies that the authenticity of human existence is ensured not by looking inwards (egocentrism) because one does not see oneself without the aid of others. Levinas supported the notion of a continual reinterpretation of history, that the traditional history which reduces singular persons to members of classes or tribes cannot be used to narrate the coming-to-pass of the Infinite in the ethical relation.

== See also ==
- Cura (mythology)
- Meonism
- Nonexistent objects
- Nothingness
- Kyoto school
- Śūnyatā

People

- Jacques Derrida
- Eugen Fink
- Martin Heidegger
