= The saying and the said =

Emmanuel Levinas, in an attempt to overcome a certain naivety within his exploration of ethics as given in what he describes as the face-to-face encounter, attempts to introduce language into what had only been a "picture" of such an encounter. He distinguishes between The saying of something and what it is that is said during the talk, The said.

== Ethics and language ==
=== The Saying ===
The Saying relates to an irreducible exposure to the other. The saying makes the self-exposure of sincerity possible, a way of giving everything, of not holding secrets, of complete generosity. One is corrupted into, learns or decides, to lie, to simulate, to dissimulate, to ignore and remain politically or economically silent.

=== The Said ===
The said, on the other hand, refers to the intelligibility and reference of what is communicated or transferred, it can be subjected to the closure truth as total presence, it is associated with ontology (i.e., philosophy and science).

Man can give himself in saying to the point of poetry – or he can withdraw into the non-saying of lies. Language as saying is an ethical openness to the other; as that which is said – reduced to a fixed identity or synchronized presence – it is an ontological closure of the other.'

The complication Levinas introduces into his analysis of the face-to-face gives his ethics a further reach toward the kind of universalist ethics of a humanism:

One can see an image of destitution and choose a logic in which to ignore it, one can hear the cry, the plea, and be summoned to the logic of another person.
