= The Cubs Fan's Guide To Happiness =

Book by George Ellis

The Cubs Fan's Guide to Happiness is a baseball book written by George Ellis. It deals with the different views of Chicago Cubs fans. It talks about things such as the theory of "There's Always Next Year" and other philosophies that Cubs fans live by. Ellis uses the thoughts of historic philosophers to prove some of the thought processes of Cubs fans that he includes in his book. In each chapter, he gives an example of how each idea can apply to a real-life situation.

== Book source ==
Ellis, George (2007). The Cubs Fan's Guide To Happiness. Chicago, Illinois: Triumph Books.
