= Alphonso Lingis =

American philosopher (1933–2025)

- Born: November 23, 1933; Crete, Illinois, U.S.
- Died: May 8, 2025 (aged 91); Maryland, U.S.

Education
- Education: Loyola University Chicago (BA); Catholic University of Leuven (PhD, 1960)
- Doctoral advisor: Alphonse De Waelhens

Philosophical work
- Era: Contemporary philosophy
- Region: Western philosophy
- School: Continental philosophy
- Institutions: Pennsylvania State University
- Doctoral students: Todd May, Robert Frodeman
- Main interests: Phenomenology, existentialism, ethics

Alphonso Lingis (November 23, 1933 – May 8, 2025) was an American philosopher, writer and translator, with Lithuanian roots, and professor emeritus of philosophy at Pennsylvania State University. His areas of specialization included phenomenology, existentialism, and ethics. Lingis is also known as a photographer, and he complemented the philosophical themes of many of his books with his own photography. After a brief illness he died in Maryland on May 8, 2025, at the age of 91.

== Career ==
Lingis attended Loyola University in Chicago, then pursued graduate studies at the Catholic University of Leuven in Belgium. His doctoral dissertation, written under Alphonse De Waelhens, was a discussion of the French phenomenologists Maurice Merleau-Ponty and Jean-Paul Sartre. Returning to the United States, Lingis joined the faculty at Duquesne University in Pittsburgh. In the mid-1960s he moved to Penn State University, where he published numerous scholarly articles on the history of philosophy, developing a passionate engagement with Continental philosophy that would prove vital to his later book career. Lingis also began working at his translation projects, and over the years, translated authors including Emmanuel Levinas, Maurice Merleau-Ponty, and Pierre Klossowski.

His first book was Excesses (1983), which inaugurated a series of books with a distinctive style: personal and anthropological, set in exotic locations, replete with references to Continental-philosophy. In 1994 Lingis published three books in a single year: The Community of Those Who Have Nothing in Common, Abuses, and Foreign Bodies. In 2000, in his mid-60's, Lingis released Dangerous Emotions, which involved a series of limit-experience “dares” along with references to a broad range of philosophical topics. Later books include Trust (2004), Body Transformations (2005), The First Person Singular (2007), Violence and Splendor (2011) and Irrevocable: A Philosophy of Mortality (2018). In the books listed above, Lingis's philosophical style is visceral, occasionally obscene, and (to say the least) beyond good and evil. Lingis's motto from Abuses (1994) that “The unlived life is not worth examining” is categorically emphasized in these books. Lingis's “phenomenology” monographs, on the other hand, (e.g. The Imperative (1998)) emphasize the Socratic point that “the unexamined life is not worth living.”

== Books ==
- Excesses: Eros and Culture (1983)
- Libido: The French Existential Theories (1985)
- Phenomenological Explanations (1986)
- Deathbound Subjectivity (1989)
- The Community of Those Who Have Nothing in Common (1994)
- Abuses (1994)
- Foreign Bodies (1994)
- Sensation: Intelligibility in Sensibility (1995)
- The Imperative (1998)
- Dangerous Emotions (2000)
- Trust (2004)
- Body Transformations (2005)
- The First Person Singular (2007)
- Wonders Seen in Forsaken Places: An Essay on the Photographs and the Process of Photography of Mark Cohen (2010)
- Contact [photographs] (2010)
- Violence and Splendor (2011)
- The Alphonso Lingis Reader, edited by Tom Sparrow (2018)
- Irrevocable: A Philosophy of Mortality (2018)

Translations (French into English)

- Emmanuel Levinas, De l’existence à l’existant (1947). Translated by Lingis as Existence and Existents (2001).
- Emmanuel Levinas, Totalité et infini: essai sur l’extériorité (1961). Translated by Lingis as Totality and Infinity: An Essay on Exteriority (1969).
- Emmanuel Levinas, Autrement qu’être ou au-delà de l’essence (1974). Translated by Lingis as Otherwise than Being, or Beyond Essence (Springer, 1991). ISBN 978-90-247-2374-4
- Maurice Merleau-Ponty, Le visible et l’Invisible (1964). Translated by Lingis as The Visible and the Invisible (1968).
- Pierre Klossowski, Sade, mon prochain (1947). Translated by Lingis as Sade My Neighbor (1991).

== See also ==
- Ecstasy (philosophy)
- American philosophy
- List of American philosophers
- Continental philosophy
- Existentialism
- Postmodernism
