= Totality and Infinity =

1961 book by Emmanuel Levinas

Totality and Infinity: An Essay on Exteriority
- Cover of the French edition
- Author: Emmanuel Levinas
- Original title: Totalité et Infini: essai sur l'extériorité
- Translator: Alphonso Lingis
- Language: French
- Subjects: Ethics, religion
- Published: 1961 (in French); 1969 (Duquesne University Press, in English)
- Publication place: France

Totality and Infinity: An Essay on Exteriority (French: Totalité et Infini: essai sur l'extériorité) is a 1961 book about ethics by the philosopher Emmanuel Levinas. Highly influenced by phenomenology, it is considered one of Levinas's most important works.

== Summary ==
=== The Other ===
Levinas advances the thesis that all ethics derive from a confrontation with an other. This other, with whom we interact concretely, represents a gateway into the more abstract Otherness.

The distinction between totality and infinity divides the limited world, which contains the other as a material body, from a spiritual world. Subjects gain access to this spiritual world, infinity, by opening themselves to the Otherness of the other. For example:

To approach the other in conversation is to welcome his expression, in which at each instant he overflows the idea a thought would carry away from it. It is therefore to receive from the Other beyond the capacity of the I, which means exactly: to have the idea of infinity. (p. 51)

=== Presence ===
Levinas places heavy emphasis on the physical presence involved in meeting the other. He argues that only a face-to-face encounter allows true connection with Infinity, because of the incessance of this type of interaction. Written words and other words do not suffice because they have become past by the time the subject perceives them. That is: they have fallen into the register of totality.

=== History ===
The book contains several observations on history and the judgement of history, like "the judgement of history is always pronounced by default."

== Reception ==
Totality and Infinity is considered an original and significant contribution to the world of philosophy—continental philosophy in particular. The work can be read as a response to Levinas's teachers, the philosophers Edmund Husserl and Martin Heidegger.

The Stanford Encyclopedia of Philosophy and Britannica both identify Totality and Infinity, along with Otherwise than Being (1974), as one of Levinas's most important works.

The philosopher Jacques Derrida criticized Totality and Infinity in his essay "Violence and Metaphysics".

== Secondary literature ==
- Callier, Bernadette. "Totality and Infinity, Alterity, and Relation: From Levinas to Glissant." Journal of Francophone Philosophy, 19(1), 2011.
- Davidson, Scott, and Diane Perpich. "Totality and Infinity at 50". Duquesne University Press, 2012.
- Derrida, Jacques. "Violence and Metaphysics: Violence and Metaphysics: An Essay on the Thought of Emmanuel Levinas," in Writing and Difference.
- Mensch, James. Lectures on Totality and Infinity .
- Mensch, James. Levinas' Existential Analytic, A Commentary on Totality and Infinity, Evanston, Il.: Northwestern University Press, 2015.
