= Real life =

Phrase discerning reality from fiction or social media

Real life is a phrase used originally in literature to distinguish between the real world and fictional, virtual or idealized worlds, and in acting to distinguish between actors and the characters they portray. It may also be called reality. It has become a common term on the internet to describe events, people, activities, and interactions occurring offline, or otherwise not primarily through the medium of the internet. It is also used as a metaphor to distinguish life in a vocational setting as opposed to an academic one, or adulthood and the adult world as opposed to childhood or adolescence.

== As distinct from fiction ==
When used to distinguish fictional worlds or universes from the consensus reality of the reader, the term has a long history:

Authors, as a rule, attempt to select and portray types rarely met with in their entirety, but these types are nevertheless more real than real life itself.

— Fyodor Dostoevsky, The Idiot (1868–69)

In her 1788 work, Original Stories from Real Life; with Conversations Calculated to Regulate the Affections, and Form the Mind to Truth and Goodness, author Mary Wollstonecraft employs the term in her title, representing the work's focus on a middle-class ethos which she viewed as superior to the court culture represented by fairy tales and the values of chance and luck found in chapbook stories for the poor. As phrased by Gary Kelly, writing about the work, "The phrase 'real life' strengthens 'original', excluding both the artificial and the fictional or imaginary."

== As distinct from the internet ==
On the internet, "real life" refers to life offline. Online, the acronym "IRL" stands for "in real life", with the meaning "not on the internet". For example, while internet users may speak of having "met" someone that they have contacted via online chat or in an online gaming context, to say that they met someone "in real life" is to say that they encountered them at a physical location. Some, arguing that the internet is part of real life, prefer to use "away from keyboard" (AFK).

Some sociologists engaged in the study of the internet have predicted that someday, a distinction between online and offline worlds may seem "quaint", noting that certain types of online activity, such as sexual intrigues, have already made a full transition to complete legitimacy and "reality".

=== Related terminology ===
The initialism "RL" stands for "real life" and "IRL" for "in real life." For example, one can speak of "meeting IRL" an online acquaintance. It may also be used to express an inability to use the internet for a time due to "RL problems". Some internet users use the idioms "face time" and "meatspace" in contrast with the term "cyberspace". "Meatspace" has appeared in the Financial Times and in science fiction literature. Some early uses of the term include a post to the Usenet newsgroup austin.public-net in 1993 and an article in The Seattle Times about John Perry Barlow in 1995. The term entered the Oxford English Dictionary in 2000.

== See also ==
- Brick and mortar business
- Face time
- Face-to-face
- Human scale
- Hyperreality
- Online and offline
- Reality
- Virtual reality
