= Monsieur Chouchani =

Jewish teacher

Monsieur Chouchani (French pronunciation: [məsjø ʃuʃani]; Hebrew: מר שושני; January 9, 1895 – January 26, 1968), also spelled Shushani and Shoshani, is the nickname of an otherwise anonymous and enigmatic Jewish teacher. His students – found in Israel, South America, post-World War II Europe, and elsewhere – included Emmanuel Levinas and Elie Wiesel.

== Biography ==
Not much is known about "Chouchani," including his real name, a secret which he zealously guarded. His origins are completely unknown, and his gravestone (located in La Paz, Canelones, Uruguay, where he died in January 1968) reads, "The wise Rabbi Chouchani of blessed memory. His birth and his life are sealed in enigma." The text is by Elie Wiesel who paid for this gravestone. The name "Shushani," which means "person from Shushan," is most probably an allegorical reference, or possibly a pun. Elie Wiesel hypothesizes that Chouchani's real name was Mordechai Rosenbaum, while Hebrew University professor Shalom Rosenberg asserts that Chouchani's actual name was Hillel Perlman. An article published by Yael Levine in 2015, based on genealogical research, brought documentation supporting the view that Chouchani was none other than Perlman, a native of Brest-Litovsk (Brisk).

By all accounts, Chouchani had the appearance of a vagabond and yet was reputed to be a master of vast areas of human knowledge, including science, mathematics, philosophy, and especially the Talmud. Most of the biographical details of Chouchani's life are known from the works and interviews of his various students, as well as anecdotes of people whom he encountered during his lifetime. Chouchani appeared in Paris after the Second World War, where he taught between the years of 1947 and 1952. He disappeared for a while after that, evidently spent some time in the newly formed state of Israel, returned to Paris briefly, and then left for South America where he lived until his death. He is buried at the Israelite Cemetery of La Paz, in Uruguay.

Although there is no known body of works by Chouchani himself, rumors had circulated for decades about notebooks in Chouchani's handwriting held by various students. In 2020, Prof. Shalom Rosenberg donated close to 100 of these notebooks to the National Library of Israel, where they are scanned. Scans of notebooks are also available at a designated website, www.mr-shoshani.org.il . In the past few years, scholars have begun working to transcribe and understand the content of the notebooks.

A French journalist named Salomon Malka wrote a 1994 book about him, entitled Monsieur Chouchani: L'énigme d'un maître du XXe siècle (Mister Shushani: The enigma of a 20th century master). In 2023, French-Jewish film director Michael Grynszpan made a documentary film about him entitled The Shoshani Riddle.

== Chouchani and Levinas ==
Emmanuel Levinas's first encounter with Chouchani and their subsequent relationship is summarized as follows:

In 1945 Levinas's closest friend, Dr. Henri Nerson, a Jewish obstetrician, told him about an outstanding and quite bizarre individual he came to know during the years of the war in the area of Vichy. The man was so unusual that even his real name was not known. He used to be called Chouchani but this was more of a nickname than his true one. His external appearance was quite unpleasant; some say even repugnant. However, according to Nerson his knowledge was phenomenal. Nerson, who was known for his sober way to apprehend people and situations, was clearly in a state of excitement as if he would have become an adept of some sect. He strongly recommended to Levinas to meet Chouchani, but for two years Levinas refused. After all (...) Levinas was quite suspicious as to what this clochard [down-and-out] looking man could contribute to him. Finally in 1947 Levinas agreed to meet Chouchani. We know very little about the meeting itself. But there exists a myth. The myth suggests that they met for an entire night, and in the morning Levinas said to Nerson as he was about to leave: "I cannot tell what he knows; all I can say is that all that I know, he knows." Be the accuracy of this myth as it may, one fact remains indisputable. From then on, Levinas became interested in the study of Talmud to a point where most of his free time, he would devote to studying it.

For the next five years Levinas studied at length with Chouchani, alone, with Nerson and in a weekly study group that would study Talmud and which included, in addition to them, a small group of friends. In 1952, Chouchani left France for Israel and came back in 1956 for about six months before leaving Europe permanently for South America, where he remained until his death in 1968.

The influence of Chouchani on Levinas is most strongly felt in Levinas' famous series of Talmudic Readings. Levinas did not acknowledge his influence until late in his life. Levinas was powerfully impressed by Chouchani's total mastery of the texts, commentaries and meta-commentaries, as well as Chouchani's ability to "widen" the scope of the Talmud using creative, dialectic methodology. One hallmark of the "Chouchani style" in Levinas's work is the method by which the interpretation of a text is understood not just by the words of a particular citation, but rather the entire context of that citation. Levinas's hermeneutical expositions on the Talmud, which he credits to his "master," manage to be simultaneously traditional and radical in feeling. As a result of his studies with Chouchani, Levinas saw the ancient text of Talmud and its multiple layers of subsequent commentary not merely as a place where "all that can ever be thought has been thought of already," but also as a framework for his reconciliation of ethics, phenomenology and postmodernity.

== Chouchani and Wiesel ==
Elie Wiesel described his initial 1947 encounter with Chouchani in Legends of Our Times (Chapter 10). Wiesel writes that Chouchani was "dirty," "hairy," and "ugly," a "vagabond" who accosted and berated him in Paris in 1947 and then became his mentor. Wiesel wrote of him again in his memoir All Rivers Run to the Sea (pp. 121–130). Wiesel credits Chouchani as being one of his most influential teachers.

== Feature Films ==
- The Shoshani Riddle - The Wanderer Who Knew It All. Film by Michael Grynszpan. Israel, 2023

== Short Films ==
- The Lost Ones: Monsieur Chouchani - Genie voller Rätsel. Film by Mathilde Hirsch. France, 2020

== See also ==
- Phenomenology
