= Otherwise than Being =

1974 book by Emmanuel Levinas

Otherwise than Being, or Beyond Essence
- Title page for Autrement qu'être ou au-delà de l'essence (1974)
- Author: Emmanuel Levinas
- Original title: Autrement qu'être ou au-delà de l'essence
- Translator: Alphonso Lingis
- Language: French
- Subjects: Philosophy, ethics, religion
- Published: 1974 (in French)
- Publication place: France

Otherwise than Being, or Beyond Essence (French: Autrement qu'être ou au-delà de l'essence) is a 1974 work of philosophy by Emmanuel Levinas, the second of his mature works after Totality and Infinity.
