= Robert Frodeman =

American philosopher

- Born: Robert Lee Frodeman; 1958 (age 67–68); St. Louis, Missouri, U.S.

Academic background
- Education: Penn State University
- Thesis: Heidegger and Proper Place of Thought (1988)
- Doctoral advisor: Alphonso Lingis
- Other advisor: Stanley Rosen

Academic work
- Discipline: Philosophy
- School or tradition: Continental philosophy
- Institutions: Fort Lewis College; University of Tennessee Chattanooga; University of Colorado; University of North Texas
- Main interests: environmental philosophy Martin Heidegger; applied philosophy; philosophy of technology

Robert Frodeman (born 1958) is an American philosopher. He is the former professor and former chair at the Department of Philosophy and Religion, University of North Texas, previously at the University of Colorado, and Director of UNT's Center for the Study of Interdisciplinarity. He publishes in the philosophy of geology, the philosophy of interdisciplinarity, and practical philosophy.

== Education ==
Frodeman attended St. Louis University, where he gained degrees in History and Philosophy (1981), Pennsylvania State University, where he obtained a Ph.D. in Philosophy (1988), studying with Stanley Rosen and Alphonso Lingis, and the University of Colorado, where he was awarded a M.S. degree in geology in 1996, while studying at INSTAAR.

== Career ==
From 1993 to 2001 Frodeman consulted for the US Geological Survey on questions of science policy, giving lectures to USGS field offices around the country. In 2001–2002, he was the Hennebach Professor of the Humanities at the Colorado School of Mines; in 2005 he was the ESRC Fellow at Lancaster University in England. In 2016 Frodeman served as a member on an Expert Committee on Altmetrics for the European Commission. Since retiring he has written on environmental questions in the American West. In 2023 Frodeman was a Fulbright Fellow at the University of Turku in Finland, and in 2025 he was a Fulbright Fellow at Uppsala University in Sweden.

== Bibliography ==
- Frodeman, R. (2000). Earth Matters: The Earth Sciences, Philosophy, And The Claims Of Community. Upper Saddle River, NJ.: Prentice Hall. ISBN 978-0-13-011996-4.
- Frodeman, R. (2003). Geo-Logic: Breaking Ground Between Philosophy And The Earth Sciences. Albany: State University of New York Press. ISBN 978-0-7914-5601-9.
- Foltz, B.V.; Frodeman, R. (2004). Rethinking Nature: Essays In Environmental Philosophy. Bloomington, Ind.: Indiana University Press. ISBN 978-0-253-34440-3.
- Callicott, B.; Frodeman, R. (2008). Encyclopedia of Environmental Ethics and Philosophy. Detroit, MI.: Cengage. ISBN 978-0-02-866137-7.
- Frodeman, R.; et al., eds. (2010). Oxford Handbook of Interdisciplinarity Sustainable Knowledge. Oxford University Press.
- Frodeman, R. (2014). Sustainable Knowledge: a theory of interdisciplinarity. Palgrave MacMillan.
- Frodeman, R.; Briggle, A. (2016). Socrates Tenured: the institutions of 21st Century Philosophy. Rowman & Littlefield.
- Frodeman, R. (2019). Transhumanism, Nature, and the Ends of Science. Routledge.
- Brister, E.; Frodeman, R. (2020). A Guide to Field Philosophy. Routledge.
- Frodeman, R. (2021). Interdisciplinarity and the Dilemmas of Knowledge', in : Bridging Research Disciplines to Advance Animal Welfare Science: A practical guide. CABI Publishing.
- Frodeman, R., Brister, E., and Propst, L., ed.s (2024). A Watershed Moment: The American West in the Age of Limits. University of Utah Press.
