= Ecstasy (philosophy) =

Term used in philosophy with different meanings in different traditions

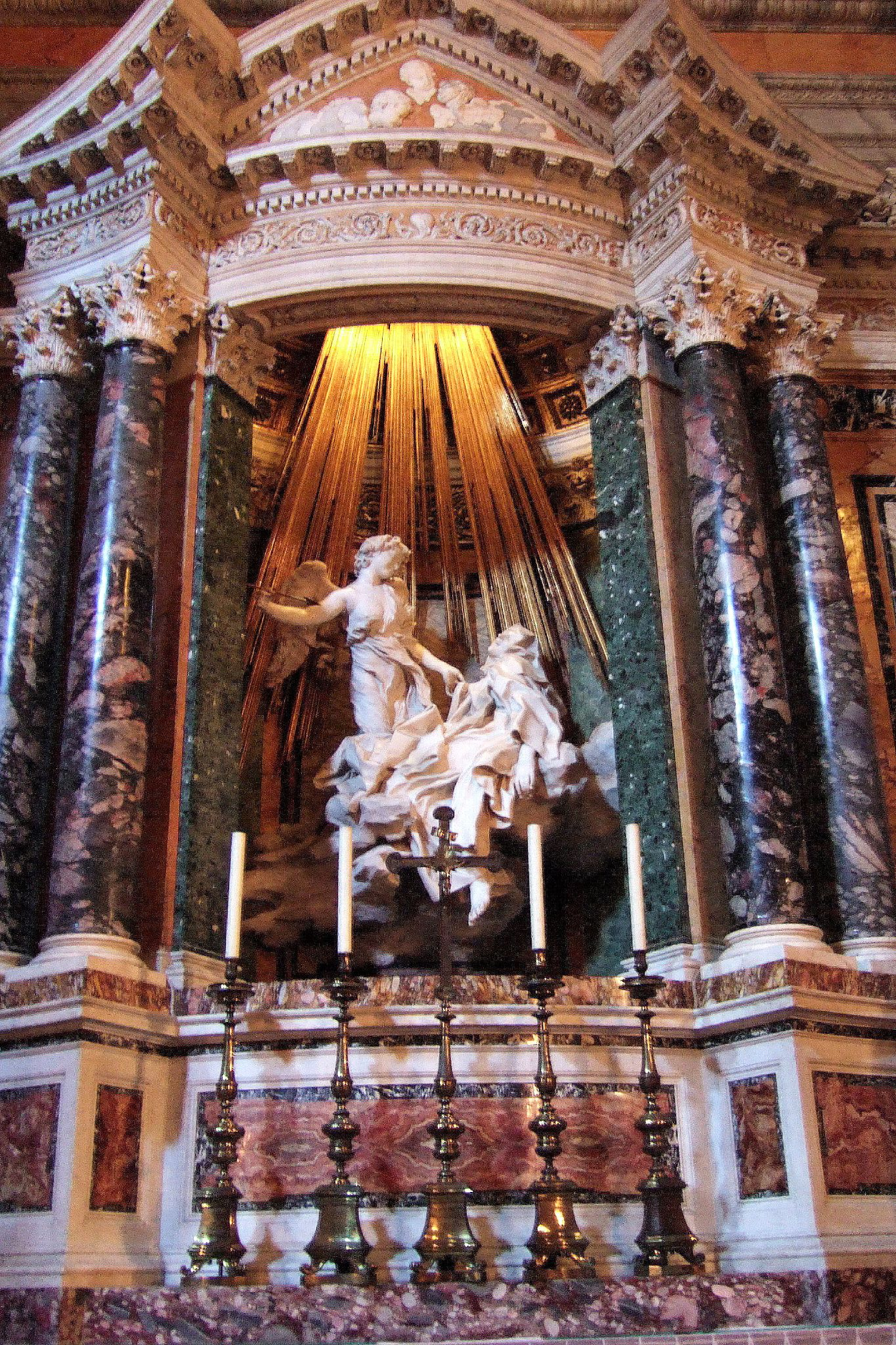
The Ecstasy of St Teresa by Gian Lorenzo Bernini (1598–1680)

In existential philosophy, ecstasy (from the Ancient Greek ἔκστασις [ékstasis] 'to be or stand outside oneself, a removal to elsewhere'; From ek- 'out' and stasis 'stand' or 'standoff of forces') describes a sense of being "outside-itself". One's consciousness, for example, is not self-enclosed, as one can be conscious of an Other person, who falls well outside one's own self. In a sense, consciousness is usually "outside itself", in that its object (what it thinks about, or perceives) is not itself. This is in contrast to the term enstasis which means from "standing-within-oneself" which relates to contemplation from the perspective of a speculator.

This understanding of enstasis gives way to the example of the use of the "ecstasy" as that one can be "outside of oneself" with time. In temporalizing, each of the following: the past (the "having-been"), the future (the "not-yet") and the present (the "making-present") are the "outside of itself" of each other. The term ecstasy (German: Ekstase) has been used in this sense by Martin Heidegger who, in his Being and Time of 1927, argued that our "being-in-the-world" (that is, existence or Dasein) is usually focused toward some person, task, or the past. Telling someone to "remain in the present" could then be self-contradictory, if the present only emerges as the "outside itself" of future possibilities (our projection; Entwurf) and past facts (our thrownness; Geworfenheit).

Emmanuel Levinas disagreed with Heidegger's position regarding ecstasy and existential temporality from the perspective of the experience of insomnia. Levinas talked of the Other in terms of 'insomnia' and 'wakefulness'. He emphasized the absolute otherness of the Other and established a social relationship between the Other and one's self. Furthermore, he asserted that ecstasy, or exteriority toward the Other, forever remains beyond any attempt at full capture; this otherness is interminable or infinite. This "infiniteness" of the Other would allow Levinas to derive other aspects of philosophy as secondary to this ethic. Levinas writes:

The others that obsess me in the other do not affect me as examples of the same genus united with my neighbor by resemblance or common nature, individuations of the human race, or chips off the old block... The others concern me from the first. Here fraternity precedes the commonness of a genus. My relationship with the Other as neighbor gives meaning to my relations with all the others.
