= Geography and imperialism =

Geography and imperialism have been intrinsically linked for centuries: some academics even consider the modern discipline of geography to have directly stemmed from imperialism. European imperialism in particular, contributed to the field of geography. As European powers sought to expand outwards and overseas, they required the knowledge to do so effectively. Thus, European expansionists relied on geographic knowledge for everything from cartography to the planning of human settlements. The field of geography, however, also relied on European imperialism to develop the subject.

The knowledge that formed the initial subject of geography was achieved through European expansionism. This includes information on the lands and seas of the earth, its flora and fauna as well as its peoples. Many geographers during the time of European territorial expansion, were in favour of imperialism.

Although there are exceptions, geographers contemporary to European territorial imperialism aided in the justification of the practice. In particular, geographers gave European states the reason of environmental determinism, which is the belief that the environment shapes character and culture. This theory deemed Europeans to be better than others because of Europe's geographical features; due to this perceived superiority, European imperialism was contemporarily justified.

== See also ==
- Gall–Peters projection#Peters world map controversy
