= Face time =

Face time is an English idiom for direct personal interaction or contact between two or more people at the same time and physical location. Face time therefore occurs in "real life" and contrasts primarily with interaction or contact which occurs over distance (e.g., via telephone) and/or electronically (e.g., via email, instant messaging, e-commerce, social media, or computer simulations).

The term was originally a colloquialism. However, it has entered the vernacular with the increasing number of people throughout the world who commonly and extensively rely on telecommunications and the Internet for personal and business communication.

== See also ==
- Digitality
- Principle of locality
- Social alienation
- Synchronicity
