= Face-to-face (philosophy) =

Philosophical concept described by Emmanuel Levinas

The face-to-face relation (French: rapport de face à face) is a concept in the French philosopher Emmanuel Levinas' thought on human sociality. It means that, ethically, people are responsible to one another in the face-to-face encounter. Specifically, Levinas says that the human face "orders and ordains" us. It calls the subject into "giving and serving" the Other.

== Overview ==
Levinas' phenomenological account of the "face-to-face" encounter serves as the basis for his ethics and the rest of his philosophy. For Levinas, "Ethics is the first philosophy." Levinas argues that the encounter of the Other through the face reveals a certain poverty which forbids a reduction to Sameness and, simultaneously, installs a responsibility for the Other in the Self.

Levinas' account of the face-to-face encounter bears many similarities to Martin Buber's "I and Thou" relation. Its influence is also particularly pronounced in Jacques Derrida's ethical writings. (However, some post-structuralist thinkers maintain that Derrida does not agree with Levinas. See, perhaps most significantly, Martin Hägglund.)

The major difference between Buber's account of the I and Thou relation and the ethics of the face-to-face encounter is the application of Levinas' asymmetry towards the other. For Buber, ethical relation meant a "symmetrical co-presence," while Levinas, on the other hand, considers the relation with the other as something inherently asymmetrical: the other as they appear, the face, gives itself priority to the self, its first demand even before I react to it, love it or kill it, is: "thou shalt not kill me". Such a demand for Levinas is prior to any reaction or any assertion of freedom by a subject. The face of the other in this sense looms above the other person and traces "where God passes." God (the infinite Other) here refers to the God of which one cannot refuse belief in Its history, that is the God who appears in traditional belief and of scripture and not some conceptual God of philosophy or ontotheology. Bettina Bergo understands Levinas' understanding of face:

The face, in its nudity and defenselessness, signifies: "Do not kill me." This defenseless nudity is therefore a passive resistance to the desire that is my freedom. Any exemplification of the face's expression, moreover, carries with it this combination of resistance and defenselessness: Levinas speaks of the face of the other who is "widow, orphan, or stranger."

In the face-to-face encounter we also see how Levinas splits ethics from morality. Ethics marks the primary situation of the face-to-face whereas morality comes later, as some kind of, agreed upon or otherwise, set of rules that emerge from the social situation, wherein there are more than just the two people of the face-to-face encounter. This ethical relation for Levinas is prior to an ontology of nature, instead he refers to it as a meontology, which affirms a meaning beyond Being, a mode of non-Being (Greek: μή, me "non" and ὄν, on "being").

== Related notions ==
Face-to-face is similar to Mikhail Bakhtin's ethical concept in art and answerability and Martin Heidegger's concept of the authentic guilt (present/face-to-face) as opposed to an inauthentic other.

== See also ==
- Face time
