= Emmanuel Levinas =

Lithuanian-French philosopher (1906–1995)

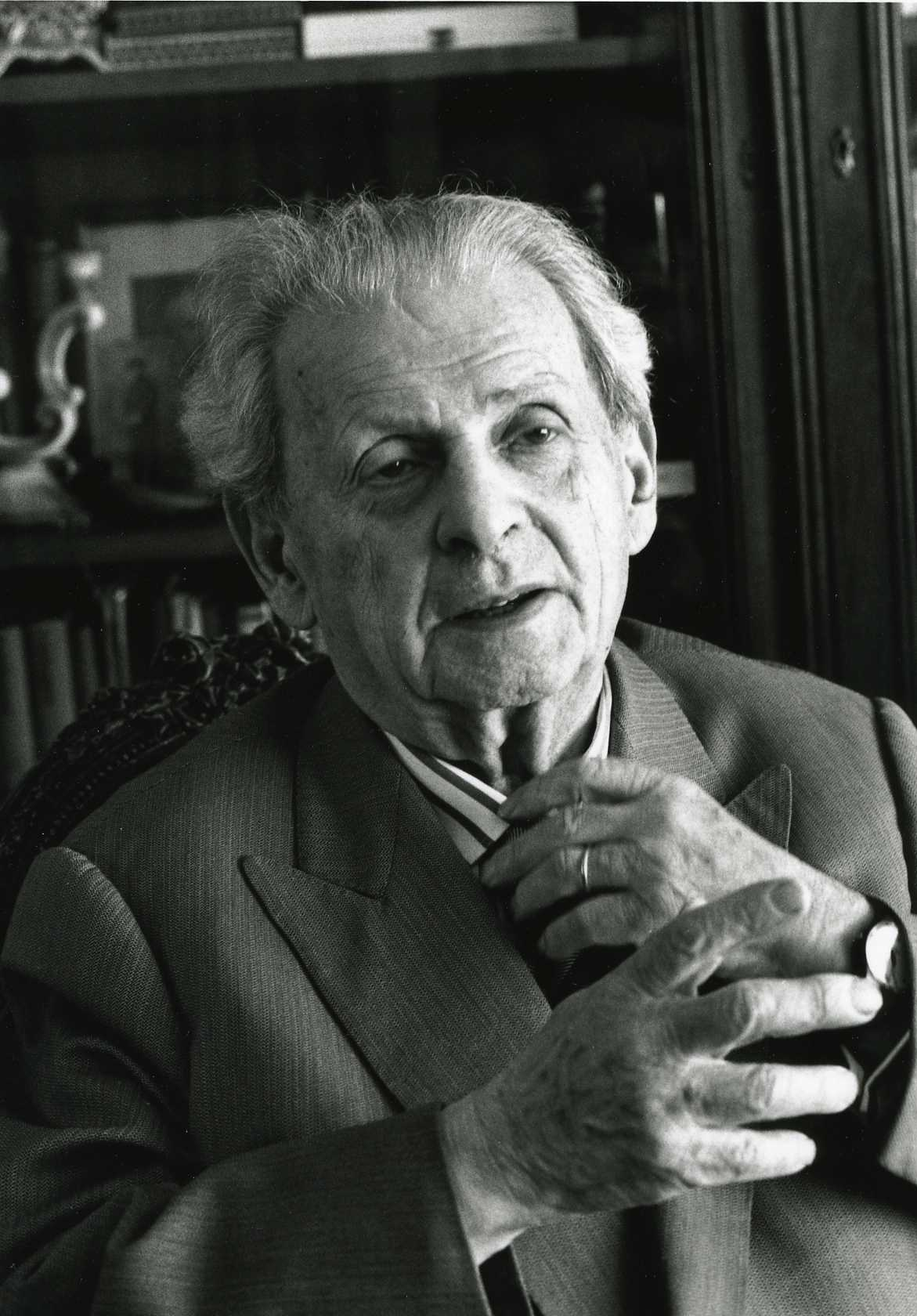
- Born: Emanuelis Levinas; 12 January 1906, O.S. 30 December 1905; Kovno, Kovno Governorate, Russian Empire (present-day Kaunas, Lithuania)
- Died: 25 December 1995 (aged 89); Clichy, France

Education
- Education: University of Freiburg (no degree); University of Strasbourg (Dr, 1929); University of Paris (DrE, 1961)
- Doctoral advisor: Maurice Pradines
- Other advisors: Martin Heidegger; Edmund Husserl

Philosophical work
- Era: 20th-century philosophy
- Region: Western philosophy
- School: Continental philosophy Existential phenomenology Jewish philosophy
- Institutions: University of Poitiers; University of Paris; University of Fribourg
- Notable students: Catherine Chalier
- Main interests: Ethics · metaphysics · ontology · Talmud · theology
- Notable ideas: "The Other" · "The Face"

Emmanuel Levinas (born Emanuelis Levinas /ˈlɛvɪnɑːs/; French: [ɛmanɥɛl levinas]; 12 January 1906 – 25 December 1995) was a French philosopher of Lithuanian Jewish ancestry who is known for his work within Jewish philosophy, existentialism, and phenomenology, focusing on the relationship of ethics to metaphysics and ontology.

== Life and career ==
Levinas was born on 12 January 1906, into a middle-class Litvak family in Kaunas, in present-day Lithuania, then Kovno district, at the Western edge of the Russian Empire. Because of the disruptions of World War I, the family moved to Kharkiv in Ukraine in 1916, where they stayed during the Russian revolutions of February and October 1917. In 1920, his family returned to the Republic of Lithuania. Levinas's early education was in secular, Russian-language schools in Kaunas and Kharkiv. Upon his family's return to the Republic of Lithuania, Levinas spent two years at a Jewish gymnasium before departing for France, where he commenced his university education.

Levinas began his philosophical studies at the University of Strasbourg in 1923, and his lifelong friendship with the French philosopher Maurice Blanchot. In 1928, he went to the University of Freiburg for two semesters to study phenomenology under Edmund Husserl. At Freiburg he also met Martin Heidegger, whose philosophy greatly impressed him. Levinas would in the early 1930s be one of the first French intellectuals to draw attention to Heidegger and Husserl by translating, in 1931, Husserl's Cartesian Meditations (with the help of Gabrielle Peiffer and with advice from Alexandre Koyré) and by drawing on their ideas in his own philosophy, in works such as La théorie de l'intuition dans la phénoménologie de Husserl (The Theory of Intuition in Husserl's Phenomenology; his 1929/30 doctoral thesis), De l'Existence à l'Existant (From Existence to Existents; 1947), and En Découvrant l’Existence avec Husserl et Heidegger (Discovering Existence with Husserl and Heidegger; first edition, 1949, with additions, 1967). In 1929, he was awarded his doctorate (Doctorat d'université degree) by the University of Strasbourg for his thesis on the meaning of intuition in the philosophy of Husserl, published in 1930.

Levinas became a naturalized French citizen in 1939. When France declared war on Germany, he reported for military duty as a translator of Russian and French. During the German invasion of France in 1940, his military unit was surrounded and forced to surrender. Levinas spent the rest of World War II as a prisoner of war in a camp near Hanover in Germany. Levinas was assigned to a special barrack for Jewish prisoners, who were forbidden any form of religious worship. Life in the Fallingbostel camp was difficult, but his status as a prisoner of war protected him from the Holocaust's concentration camps. Other prisoners saw him frequently jotting in a notebook. These jottings were later developed into his book De l'Existence à l'Existant (1947) and a series of lectures published under the title Le Temps et l'Autre (1948). His wartime notebooks have now been published in their original form as Œuvres: Tome 1, Carnets de captivité: suivi de Écrits sur la captivité; et, Notes philosophiques diverses (2009).

Meanwhile, Maurice Blanchot helped Levinas's wife and daughter spend the war in a monastery, thus sparing them from the Holocaust. Blanchot, at considerable personal risk, also saw to it that Levinas was able to keep in contact with his immediate family through letters and other messages. Other members of Levinas's family were not so fortunate; his mother-in-law was deported and never heard from again, while his father and brothers were killed by the SS in Lithuania. After the Second World War, he studied the Talmud under the enigmatic Monsieur Chouchani, whose influence he acknowledged only late in his life.

Levinas's first book-length essay, Totality and Infinity (1961), was written as his Doctorat d'État primary thesis (roughly equivalent to a Habilitation thesis). His secondary thesis was titled Études sur la phénoménologie (Studies on Phenomenology). After earning his habilitation, Levinas taught at a private Jewish High School in Paris, the École normale israélite orientale (Paris), eventually becoming its director. He participated in 1957 at the International Meeting at the monastery of Toumliline, a conference focused on contemporary challenges and interfaith dialogue. Levinas began teaching at the University of Poitiers in 1961, at the Nanterre campus of the University of Paris in 1967, and at the Sorbonne in 1973, from which he retired in 1979. He published his second major philosophical work, Autrement qu'être ou au-delà de l'essence, in 1974. He was also a professor at the University of Fribourg in Switzerland. In 1989, he was awarded the Balzan Prize for Philosophy.

According to his obituary in The New York Times, Levinas came to regret his early enthusiasm for Heidegger, after the latter joined the Nazis. Levinas explicitly framed several of his mature philosophical works as attempts to respond to Heidegger's philosophy in light of its ethical failings.

His son is the composer Michaël Levinas, and his son-in-law is the French mathematician Georges Hansel. Among his most famous students is Rabbi Baruch Garzon from Tetouan (Morocco), who studied with Levinas at the Sorbonne and later went on to become one of the most important Rabbis of the Spanish-speaking world.

== Philosophy ==
In the 1950s, Levinas emerged from the circle of intellectuals surrounding the philosopher Jean Wahl as a leading French thinker. His work is based on the ethics of the Other or, in Levinas's terms, on "ethics as first philosophy". For Levinas, the Other is not knowable and cannot be made into an object of the self, as is done by traditional metaphysics (which Levinas called "ontology"). Levinas prefers to think of philosophy as the "wisdom of love" rather than the "love of wisdom" (the usual translation of the Greek "φιλοσοφία"). In his view, responsibility towards the Other precedes any "objective searching after truth".

Levinas derives the primacy of his ethics from the experience of the encounter with the Other. For Levinas, the irreducible relation, the epiphany, of the face-to-face, the encounter with another, is a privileged phenomenon in which the other person's proximity and distance are both strongly felt. "The Other precisely reveals himself in his alterity not in a shock negating the I, but as the primordial phenomenon of gentleness." At the same time, the revelation of the face makes a demand, and this demand is before one can express or know one's freedom to affirm or deny. One instantly recognizes the transcendence and heteronomy of the Other. Even murder fails as an attempt to take hold of this otherness.

While critical of traditional theology, Levinas does require that a "trace" of the Divine be acknowledged within an ethics of Otherness. This is especially evident in his thematization of debt and guilt. "A face is a trace of itself, given over to my responsibility, but to which I am wanting and faulty. It is as though I were responsible for his mortality, and guilty for surviving." The moral "authority" of the face of the Other is felt in my "infinite responsibility" for the Other. The face of the Other comes towards me with its infinite moral demands while emerging out of the trace.

Apart from this morally imposing emergence, the Other's face might well be adequately addressed as "Thou" (along the lines proposed by Martin Buber) in whose welcoming countenance I might find great comfort, love and communion of souls—but not a moral demand bearing down upon me from a height. "Through a trace the irreversible past takes on the profile of a 'He.' The beyond from which a face comes is in the third person." It is because the Other also emerges from the illeity of a He (il in French) that I instead fall into infinite debt vis-à-vis the Other in a situation of utterly asymmetrical obligations: I owe the Other everything, the Other owes me nothing. The trace of the Other is the heavy shadow of God, the God who commands, "Thou shalt not kill!" Levinas takes great pains to avoid straightforward theological language. The very metaphysics of signification subtending theological language is suspected and suspended by evocations of how traces work differently than signs. Nevertheless, the divinity of the trace is also undeniable: "the trace is not just one more word: it is the proximity of God in the countenance of my fellowman." In a sense, it is divine commandment without divine authority.

Following Totality and Infinity, Levinas later argued that responsibility for the other is rooted within the subjective constitution. The first line of the preface of this book is "everyone will readily agree that it is of the highest importance to know whether we are not duped by morality." This idea appears in his thoughts on recurrence (chapter 4 in Otherwise than Being), in which Levinas maintains that subjectivity is formed in and through subjection to the other. Subjectivity, Levinas argued, is primordially ethical, not theoretical: that is to say, responsibility for the other is not a derivative feature of subjectivity, but instead, founds subjective being-in-the-world by giving it a meaningful direction and orientation. Levinas's thesis "ethics as first philosophy", then, means that the traditional philosophical pursuit of knowledge is secondary to a basic ethical duty to the other. To meet the Other is to have the idea of Infinity.

The elderly Levinas was a distinguished French public intellectual, whose books reportedly sold well. He had a major influence on the younger, but more well-known Jacques Derrida, whose seminal Writing and Difference contains an essay, "Violence and Metaphysics", that was instrumental in expanding interest in Levinas in France and abroad. Derrida also delivered a eulogy at Levinas's funeral, later published as Adieu à Emmanuel Levinas, an appreciation and exploration of Levinas's moral philosophy. In a memorial essay for Levinas, Jean-Luc Marion claimed that "If one defines a great philosopher as someone without whom philosophy would not have been what it is, then in France there are two great philosophers of the 20th century: Bergson and Lévinas."

His works have been a source of controversy since the 1950s, when Simone de Beauvoir criticized his account of the subject as being necessarily masculine, as defined against a feminine other. While other feminist philosophers like Tina Chanter and the artist-thinker Bracha L. Ettinger have defended him against this charge, increasing interest in his work in the 2000s brought a reevaluation of the possible misogyny of his account of the feminine, as well as a critical engagement with his French nationalism in the context of colonialism. Among the most prominent of these are critiques by Simon Critchley and Stella Sandford. However, there have also been responses which argue that these critiques of Levinas are misplaced.

== Cultural influence ==
For three decades, Levinas gave short talks on Rashi, a medieval French rabbi, every Shabbat morning at the Jewish high school in Paris where he was the principal. This tradition strongly influenced many generations of students.

Jean-Pierre and Luc Dardenne, renowned Belgian filmmakers, have referred to Levinas as an important underpinning for their filmmaking ethics.

In his book Levinas and the Cinema of Redemption: Time, Ethics, and the Feminine, author Sam B. Girgus argues that Levinas has dramatically affected films involving redemption.

Magician Derren Brown's A Book of Secrets references Levinas.

== Published works ==
A full bibliography of all Levinas's publications up until 1981 is found in Roger Burggraeve Emmanuel Levinas (1982).

A list of works, translated into English but not appearing in any collections, may be found in Critchley, S. and Bernasconi, R. (eds.), The Cambridge Companion to Levinas (Cambridge UP, 2002), pp. 269–270.

Books

- 1929. Sur les « Ideen » de M. E. Husserl
- 1930. La théorie de l'intuition dans la phénoménologie de Husserl (The Theory of Intuition in Husserl's Phenomenology)
- 1931. Der Begriff des Irrationalen als philosophisches Problem (with Heinz Erich Eisenhuth)
- 1931. Fribourg, Husserl et la phénoménologie
- 1931. Les recherches sur la philosophie des mathématiques en Allemagne, aperçu général (with W. Dubislav)
- 1931. Méditations cartésiennes. Introduction à la phénoménologie (with Edmund Husserl and Gabrielle Peiffer)
- 1932. Martin Heidegger et l'ontologie
- 1934. La présence totale (with Louis Lavelle)
- 1934. Phénoménologie
- 1934. Quelques réflexions sur la philosophie de l'hitlérisme
- 1935. De l'évasion
- 1935. La notion du temps (with N. Khersonsky)
- 1935. L'actualité de Maimonide
- 1935. L'inspiration religieuse de l'Alliance
- 1936. Allure du transcendental (with Georges Bénézé)
- 1936. Esquisses d'une énergétique mentale (with J. Duflo)
- 1936. Fraterniser sans se convertir
- 1936. Les aspects de l'image visuelle (with R. Duret)
- 1936. L'esthétique française contemporaine (with Valentin Feldman)
- 1936. L'individu dans le déséquilibre moderne (with R. Munsch)
- 1936. Valeur (with Georges Bénézé)
- 1947. De l'existence à l'existant (Existence and Existents)
- 1948. Le Temps et l'Autre (Time and the Other)
- 1949. En Découvrant l'Existence avec Husserl et Heidegger (Discovering Existence with Husserl and Heidegger)
- 1961. Totalité et Infini: essai sur l'extériorité (Totality and Infinity: An Essay on Exteriority)
- 1962. De l'Évasion (On Escape)
- 1963 & 1976. Difficult Freedom: Essays on Judaism
- 1968. Quatre lectures talmudiques
- 1972. Humanisme de l'autre homme (Humanism of the Other)
- 1974. Autrement qu'être ou au-delà de l'essence (Otherwise than Being or Beyond Essence)
- 1976. Sur Maurice Blanchot
- 1976. Noms propres (Proper Names) - includes the essay "Sans nom" ("Nameless")
- 1977. Du Sacré au saint – cinq nouvelles lectures talmudiques
- 1980. Le Temps et l'Autre
- 1982. L'Au-delà du verset: lectures et discours talmudiques (Beyond the Verse: Talmudic Readings and Lectures)
- 1982. Of God Who Comes to Mind
- 1982. Ethique et infini (Ethics and Infinity: Dialogues of Emmanuel Levinas and Philippe Nemo)
- 1984. Transcendence et intelligibilité (Transcendence and Intelligibility)
- 1988. A l'Heure des nations (In the Time of the Nations)
- 1991. Entre Nous
- 1995. Altérité et transcendence (Alterity and Transcendence)
- 1998. De l'obliteration. Entretien avec Françoise Armengaud à propos de l'œuvre de Sosno (»On Obliteration: Discussing Sacha Sosno, trans. Richard A. Cohen, in: Art and Text (winter 1989), 30-41.)
- 2006. Œuvres: Tome 1, Carnets de captivité: suivi de Écrits sur la captivité; et, Notes philosophiques diverses, Posthumously published by Grasset & Fasquelle

Articles in English

- "A Language Familiar to Us". Telos 44 (Summer 1980). New York: Telos Press.

== See also ==
- Alterity
- Authenticity
- Face-to-face
- Golden Rule
- Ecstasy in philosophy
- Other
- Jewish philosophy
- Martin Buber
- Knud Ejler Løgstrup
