= The Missing Shade of Blue =

Philosophical concept

"The Missing Shade of Blue" is an example introduced by the Scottish philosopher David Hume to show that it is at least conceivable that the mind can generate an idea without first being exposed to the relevant sensory experience. It is regarded as a problem by philosophers because it appears to stand in direct contradiction to what Hume had previously written.

== The source of the problem ==
In both A Treatise of Human Nature and An Enquiry Concerning Human Understanding, philosopher David Hume argues that all perceptions of the mind can be classed as either 'Impressions' or 'Ideas'. He further argues that:

We shall always find, that every idea which we examine is copied from a similar impression. Those who would assert, that this position is not universally true nor without exception, have only one, and at that an easy method of refuting it; by producing that idea, which, in their opinion, is not derived from this source.

The Missing Shade of Blue

The problem of the missing shade of blue arises because just two paragraphs later Hume seems to provide just such an idea. He says:

There is, however, one contradictory phenomenon, which may prove, that it is not absolutely impossible for ideas to arise, independent of their correspondent impressions. I believe it will readily be allowed, that the several distinct ideas of colour, which enter by the eye, or those of sound, which are conveyed by the ear, are really different from each other; though, at the same time, resembling. Now if this be true of different colours, it must be no less so of the different shades of the same colour; and each shade produces a distinct idea, independent of the rest. For if this should be denied, it is possible, by the continual gradation of shades, to run a colour insensibly into what is most remote from it; and if you will not allow any of the means to be different, you cannot, without absurdity, deny the extremes to be the same. Suppose, therefore, a person to have enjoyed his sight for thirty years, and to have become perfectly acquainted with colours of all kinds, except one particular shade of blue, for instance, which it never has been his fortune to meet with. Let all the different shades of that colour, except that single one, be placed before him, descending gradually from the deepest to the lightest; it is plain, that he will perceive a blank, where that shade is wanting, and will be sensible, that there is a greater distance in that place between the contiguous colours than in any other. Now I ask, whether it be possible for him, from his own imagination, to supply this deficiency, and raise up to himself the idea of that particular shade, though it had never been conveyed to him by his senses? I believe there are few but will be of opinion that he can: And this may serve as a proof, that the simple ideas are not always, in every instance, derived from the correspondent impressions; though this instance is so singular, that it is scarcely worth our observing, and does not merit, that for it alone we should alter our general maxim.

== Responses to the problem ==
Some philosophers take Hume to task for presenting such a clear counter-example and then dismissing it as insignificant. Pritchard says:

This is, of course, just the kind of fact which should have led Hume to revise his whole theory. It is really effrontery on his part and not mere naiveness to ignore an instance so dead against a fundamental doctrine of his own...if he had considered the idea of cause as also to be ignored as being an isolated exceptional case, he would have had no reason to write the Treatise at all.

Other philosophers take a more generous view of Hume's position. Jenkins says:

It is not so much that it is hardly worth altering a general thesis for one exception, which is very much the line Hume himself adopts. It is rather that the character of the phenomenon itself does not clearly run counter to the essential emphasis of Hume's doctrine. That emphasis really consists in the claim that, ultimately, there can be no ideas without impressions. His example does not, strictly, disobey this principle since, presumably, Hume would argue that, without sensory experience of other colours and particularly of other shades of blue, the missing shade could not be envisaged. It is not an admission of innatism, nor is it a claim that the idea was, as it were, produced out of a hat. It is perhaps nothing more than the concession that the natural powers of the mind are a little more enterprising than he had allowed for.

It is sometimes said that the problem is even more severe than Hume thinks. Hume claims that this instance is 'singular', but Alexander Broadie writes:

The reason Hume's instance is not singular, is this: if indeed a person can have an idea of a shade of blue, though he had not had a previous impression of that shade, then we have to allow that a person could have an idea of missing shades of every other colour also; and there is no reason why we should restrict ourselves here to a consideration of only the visual one of the five sensory modalities. We could also have an idea of a missing sound, or taste, or smell, or tactile quality.

However, as Williams points out, Hume's own words imply that he was fully aware of this. Hume begins the relevant paragraph by talking about both sounds and colours. In addition, when first introducing the missing shade of blue he says, "except one particular shade of blue, for instance". The words "for instance" show that he could easily have chosen a different example. When he later says, "this instance is so singular, that it is scarcely worth our observing" he cannot be referring to this particular example, but rather to the type of exception that it represents.

When Hume says, "Let all the different shades of that colour, except that single one, be placed before him," he is assuming that colours are composed of a set of distinct independent hues, when in reality they form a continuum. However, Fogelin suggests, "Perhaps the reason that Hume does not see this is that he is thinking about the ideas of objects and not about objects themselves. In particular, he may hold that the notion of an indistinguishable difference between ideas make no sense. There is nothing more to an idea than that which can be discerned within it. If this is Hume's position, then the notion that two ideas can be different without being discernibly different would be a contradiction in terms."

== Suggested solutions ==
A fully adequate solution to the problem will have the following features. It will:

1. Recognise that Hume believed the problem to be a genuine counter-example;
2. Recognise that Hume included the example for a purpose;
3. Provide an explanation that harmonizes well with other features of Hume's epistemology.

The problem has been tackled in various ways:

=== Mental mixing ===
Mental mixing is the solution proposed by Morris. The idea here is that just as paints are mixed to produce the range of colour swatches found in a hardware store, so it should be possible for colours to be mixed in the mind in some kind of analogous way. However, without further argument it is not obvious that we are endowed with any such ability and, if we were, it is not clear why it would be limited to the mixing of closely related impressions; yet, if this were not the case, then, contrary to what Morris says, it would open the floodgates to a range of philosophically suspect ideas.

=== Colours as complex ideas ===
Another way of dissolving the problem has been to suggest that colours might also be regarded as complex ideas. This is tempting since Hume has only spoken of "the faculty of compounding, transposing, augmenting, or diminishing the materials afforded us by the senses." That 'augmenting' and 'diminishing' do not apply only to physical size is clear from the way Hume suggests that our idea of God "arises from reflecting on the operations of our own mind, and augmenting, without limit, those qualities of goodness and wisdom." However, this fails our third criterion, for Hume clearly distinguishes between complex ideas and simple ideas in a way that excludes the possibility of colours being complex. In the treatise (Book1, Part1, Section1), Hume writes:

Simple perceptions or impressions and ideas are such as admit of no distinction nor separation. The complex are the contrary to these, and may be distinguished into parts. Though a particular colour, taste, and smell, are qualities all united together in this apple, it is easy to perceive they are not the same, but are at least distinguishable from each other.

=== It does not undermine Hume's main concern ===
Hume's lack of concern might be explained by the fact that, although it contradicts the claim that all simple ideas are preceded by simple impressions, this is not a problem because it is not Hume's primary concern. This answer draws attention to what Hume says at the end of Section 2 of the Enquiries:

When we entertain, therefore, any suspicion that a philosophical term is employed without any meaning or idea (as is but too frequent), we need but enquire, from what impression is that supposed idea derived? And if it be impossible to assign any, this will serve to confirm our suspicion. By bringing ideas into so clear a light we may reasonably hope to remove all dispute, which may arise, concerning their nature and reality.

The fact that this contradicts Hume's explicitly stated purpose is explained by arguing that the Treatise has to be understood as a gradual unfolding of his views. The problem is that Hume never makes this clear, and if this is the way it is meant to be read then, as Williams says, "The narrative character of the Treatise is...disguised...by the superficial resemblance of the former to Locke's Essay... Also, there is the fact that he drops the problem in the same way in the Enquiry, which arguably lacks the narrative character of the Treatise."

=== The exception really is singular ===
Fogelin argues that the reason this exception is a genuine exception that can be safely ignored is because despite being simple ideas, colours and shades can be organised into a highly organised colour space, (and that sounds and tastes, etc., can be similarly organised.) Hume allows that some simple ideas can be seen to be similar to one another without them sharing anything in common. The proviso that they do not share anything in common is important because otherwise this feature might be separated off and this would show that the original idea was in fact complex. In a note added to the Treatise commenting on abstract ideas Hume says:

It is evident, that even different simple ideas may have a similarity or resemblance to each other; nor is it necessary, that the point or circumstance of resemblance should be distinct or separable from that in which they differ. BLUE and GREEN are different simple ideas, but are more resembling than BLUE and SCARLET; though their perfect simplicity excludes all possibility of separation or distinction. It is the same case with particular sounds, and tastes and smells. These admit of infinite resemblances upon the general appearance and comparison, without having any common circumstance the same. And of this we may be certain, even from the very abstract terms SIMPLE IDEA. They comprehend all simple ideas under them. These resemble each other in their simplicity. And yet from their very nature, which excludes all composition, this circumstance, in which they resemble, is not distinguishable nor separable from the rest. It is the same case with all the degrees in any quality. They are all resembling and yet the quality, in any individual, is not distinct from the degree.

It is this very ability to recognize similarity that enables us to arrange the shades of blue in order and to notice that two adjoining shades differ more than any two other adjoining shades. If it is allowed that the notion of hue can arise through abstraction even though it cannot in any instance be separated from a given example, then it may be fairly argued that the ability to fill a gap in the colour space is quite a different matter from coming up with an isolated idea without any prior impression. It would certainly still be the case that the ability to conjure up the idea of the missing shade of blue is dependent on at least some prior impressions.

The problem with this claim is that there needs to be some way of showing that the exception really is limited and will not affect the important general claim that ideas depend on impressions. Suppose, therefore, a person to have enjoyed his sight for thirty years, and to have become perfectly acquainted with regular polygons of all kinds except the one having five sides...

=== Hume needs an exception ===
By whatever means the idea of the missing shade is to be created, there is still the question of why Hume takes such pains to present the example to his readers. Of course, it may just be that Hume was aware of it as an exception and was being open and honest. On the other hand, Nelson suggests the intriguing possibility that far from being an oversight or an embarrassment to his wider project, the missing shade of blue example turns out to be crucial. Later Hume will divide all objects of human reason into 'Relations of Ideas' and 'Matters of Fact'. The former are certain and do not necessarily say anything about what actually exists in the world; the latter do make claims about the world, but "the contrary of every matter of fact is still possible". With this in mind it can be asked what status holds for the claim that "all our ideas or more feeble perceptions are copies of our impressions or more lively ones". If this is a Relation of Ideas, then it does not necessarily say anything true about the world, and this will not suit Hume's purpose at all; if it is a Matter of Fact, then the contrary must be possible. The inconsequential hypothetical possibility that we are able to raise up to ourselves the idea of the missing shade of blue, even if in practice this does not ever happen, will ensure that Hume's description of the origin of ideas is grounded in fact.

However, what is required of matters of fact is the logical possibility that they could be other than they are, not the practical possibility. This being the case, it is not necessary to construct an elaborately worked out example; it would be sufficient to say that we might have been constituted differently.

=== A singular exception doesn't really change the probability of Hume's thesis ===
Hume states that the model of rationality that humans use and must use with regard to reasonings concerning matters of fact is not classical logic, but rather some kind of probabilistic logic where we associate a probability to factual statements (indeed, recalling Locke, Hume calls reasoning about matters of fact as merely probable, and contrasts it with the demonstrative kind of reasoning that instead concerns relations of ideas). This is especially clear in Hume's treatment of miracles in Section X of the Enquiry, in which he claims that the probability of a certain factual thesis (in this case the thesis that "miracles do occur") is and must be evaluated by weighting all the evidences in favour of it with all the contrary evidences.

Since Hume's thesis that "all simple ideas come from simple impressions" is a matter of fact (ie. a factual statement), we can associate a probability to it. And the only way of evaluating the probability of this thesis is by weighting all the evidences. Since, except the "missing shade of blue", all the countless other direct evidences favour it, the influence (via Bayes' theorem) of this singular contrary evidence on the probability of Hume's thesis can reasonably be expected to be minimal. And that's why Hume can reasonably say that this contrary evidence can be disregarded or, as he puts it, that «it is scarcely worth our observing, and does not merit, that for it alone we should alter our general maxim».

Against such interpretation is the fact that Hume himself in Section II calls the "missing shade of blue" as a «proof, that the simple ideas are not always, in every instance, derived from the correspondent impressions», where in Section VI he defines "proof" as not a demonstrative argument but as an argument from experience that «leaves no room for doubt or opposition». If Hume is using his terminology consistently across sections, then his use of the term "proof" in reference to the "missing shade of blue" would imply that its effect on the probability of the thesis would not at all be minimal, but rather that it would enormously decrease it to the point of "leaving no room" in favour of the thesis itself.

== See also ==
- Color vision
- Mary's room
- New riddle of induction
