= Rational love =

Rational love is love based upon intellect, reason or spirituality rather than natural love which is based upon instinct, intuition or romance.
