= An Enquiry Concerning the Principles of Morals =

1751 book by Scottish enlightenment philosopher David Hume (1711–1776)

- Author: David Hume
- Language: English
- Publication date: 1751

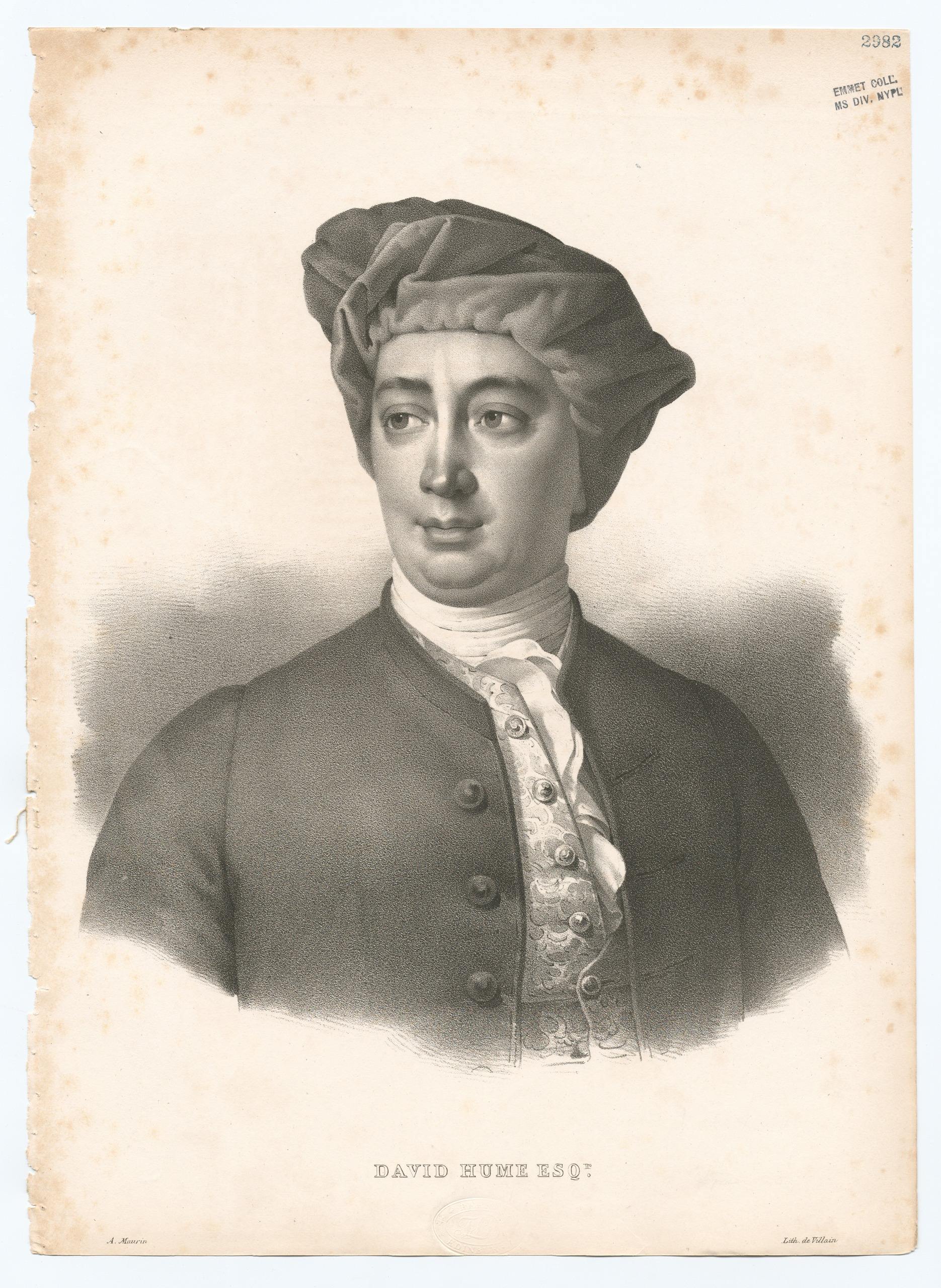
David Hume

An Enquiry Concerning the Principles of Morals is a book by Scottish enlightenment philosopher David Hume. In it, Hume argues (among other things) that the foundations of morals lie with sentiment, not reason.

An Enquiry Concerning the Principles of Morals (EPM) is the enquiry subsequent to the Enquiry Concerning Human Understanding (EHU). Thus, it is often referred to as his "second Enquiry". It was written whilst Hume was living at his brother's country house, some short time after his mother's death, and originally published in 1751, three years after the first Enquiry. Hume first discusses ethics in A Treatise of Human Nature (in Book 3 - "Of Morals"). He later extracted and expounded upon the ideas he proposed there in his second Enquiry. In his short autobiographical work, My Own Life (1776), Hume states that his second Enquiry was "of all my writings, historical, philosophical, or literary, incomparably the best".

== Summary ==
=== Method ===
Hume's approach in the second Enquiry is largely an empirical one. Instead of beginning his moral inquiry with questions of how morality ought to operate, he investigates primarily how we actually do make moral judgments. As Hume puts it:

As this is a question of fact, not of abstract science, we can only expect success, by following the experimental method, and deducing general maxims from a comparison of particular instances. (EPM, §1, ¶10)

Furthermore, Hume aims to provide a naturalistic account of morality, at least to the extent that it is something that is common among the human species. He writes:

The final sentence, it is probable, which pronounces characters and actions amiable or odious, praise-worthy or blameable... depends on some internal sense or feeling, which nature has made universal in the whole species. (EPM, §1, ¶8)

But, whether in the end Hume provides a normative ethical theory, rather than a merely descriptive theory of moral psychology, is a contentious issue among Hume scholars.

=== Sentimentalism and reason ===
Hume defends his sympathy-based moral sentimentalism by claiming that, contrary to moral rationalism, we can never make moral judgments based on reason alone. Reason deals with facts and draws conclusions from them, but, all else being equal, it could not lead us to choose one option over the other; only our sentiments can do this, according to Hume. Hume writes that:

...morality is determined by sentiment. It defines virtue to be whatever mental action or quality gives to a spectator the pleasing sentiment of approbation; and vice the contrary. (EPM, Appendix 1, ¶10)

Hume puts forward sentimentalism as a foundation for ethics primarily as a meta-ethical theory about the epistemology of morality. Hume's sentimentalism is akin to the moral epistemology of intuitionism (although, of course, different in many respects). According to such a theory, one's epistemological access to moral truths is not primarily via an evidentially mediated faculty, such as reason. Rather, one's epistemological access is more direct. According to Hume, we know moral truths via our sentiments—our feelings of approval and disapproval.

Hume's arguments against founding morality on reason are often now included in the category of moral anti-realist arguments. As Humean-inspired philosopher John Mackie suggests, for there to exist moral facts about the world, recognizable by reason and intrinsically motivating, they would have to be very queer facts. However, there is considerable debate among scholars as to Hume's status as a realist versus anti-realist.

=== Sympathy, altruism, and egoism ===
According to Hume, our sympathy-based sentiments can motivate us towards the pursuit of non-selfish ends. For Hume, and for fellow sympathy-theorist Adam Smith, the term "sympathy" is meant to capture much more than concern for the suffering of others. Sympathy, for Hume, is a principle for the communication and sharing of sentiments, both positive and negative. In this sense, it is akin to what contemporary psychologists and philosophers call empathy. In developing this sympathy-based moral sentimentalism, Hume surpasses the divinely-implanted moral sense theory of his predecessor, Francis Hutcheson, by elaborating a naturalistic, moral psychological basis for the moral sense, in terms of the operation of sympathy.

After providing various examples, Hume comes to the conclusion that most, though not all, of the behaviors we approve of increase public utility. Does this then mean that we make moral judgments on self-interest alone? Unlike his fellow empiricist Thomas Hobbes, Hume argues that this is not in fact the case, rejecting psychological egoism—the view that all intentional actions are ultimately self-interested.

In addition to considerations of self-interest, Hume maintains that we can be moved by our sympathy for others, which can provide a person with thoroughly non-selfish concerns and motivations, indeed, what contemporary theorists would call, altruistic concern.

=== Virtue ethics ===
The first-order moral theory that emerges from the second Enquiry is a form of virtue ethics. According to Hume, the kinds of things that our moral sentiments apply to—the things of which we approve and disapprove—are not particular actions or events. Rather, we ultimately judge the character of a person—whether they are a virtuous or vicious person.

Hume ultimately defends a theory according to which the fundamental feature of virtues is "...the possession of mental qualities, 'useful' or 'agreeable' to the 'person himself' or to 'others'" (EPM, §10, ¶1). As a result, certain character traits commonly deemed virtues by the major religions of the time are deemed vices on Hume's theory. Hume calls these so-called "virtues", such as self-denial and humility, monkish virtues. Rather vehemently, he writes:

Celibacy, fasting, penance, mortification, self-denial, humility, silence, solitude, and the whole train of monkish virtues; for what reason are they everywhere rejected by men of sense, but because they serve to no manner of purpose; neither advance a man's fortune in the world, nor render him a more valuable member of society; neither qualify him for the entertainment of company, nor increase his power of self-enjoyment? We observe, on the contrary, that they cross all these desirable ends; stupify the understanding and harden the heart, obscure the fancy and sour the temper. We justly, therefore, transfer them to the opposite column, and place them in the catalogue of vices... (EPM, §9, ¶3)

Clearly, Hume thought that there were grave misunderstandings at the time as to what counts as virtue versus vice. For example, Hume attempts to defend, contrary to many religious teachings, that a certain amount of luxury, even pride, is virtuous.

Hume makes important distinctions in his classifications of virtues. They are classified as being either "artificial" or "natural". The key distinction between these virtue classes is their origin. Artificial virtues originate from and depend on social structures such as courts and parliaments. This category of virtues include fidelity, justice, chastity and adherence to law. Natural virtues are not created but are automatically present in humans since birth. The following quote highlights this:

The epithets SOCIABLE, GOOD-NATURED, HUMANE, MERCIFUL, GRATEFUL, FRIENDLY, GENEROUS, BENEFICENT, or their equivalents, are known in all languages, and universally express the highest merit, which HUMAN NATURE is capable of attaining. (EPM, Section 2, Part 1)

Hence, the second major distinction between natural and artificial virtues is that the former type are universal whereas the latter can vary from society to society. Hume then proceeds to delineate the nature of these virtues in detail. The following quote highlights Hume's description of an "artificial" virtue—that of fidelity:

The long and helpless infancy of man requires the combination of parents for the subsistence of their young; and that combination requires the virtue of chastity or fidelity to the marriage bed. (EPM, Section 4)

The following quote highlights the origin of this virtue - the notion that this virtue was "created" is particularly evident:

Without such a UTILITY, it will readily be owned, that such a virtue would never have been thought of. (EPM, Section 4)

Clearly then, the virtue of fidelity was "created", and therefore it is distinctly artificial.

== Sources and further reading ==
- Cohon, Rachel (2004). "Hume's Moral Philosophy", Stanford Encyclopedia of Philosophy, E. Zalta (ed.). (link)
- Fieser, James (2006). "David Hume (1711-1776) - Moral Theory", Internet Encyclopedia of Philosophy, J. Fieser and B.H. Dowden (eds.) U. Tennessee/Martin. (link)
- Morris, William Edward (2005), "David Hume", Stanford Encyclopedia of Philosophy, E. Zalta (ed.). (link)
