= Intellect =

Faculty of the human mind

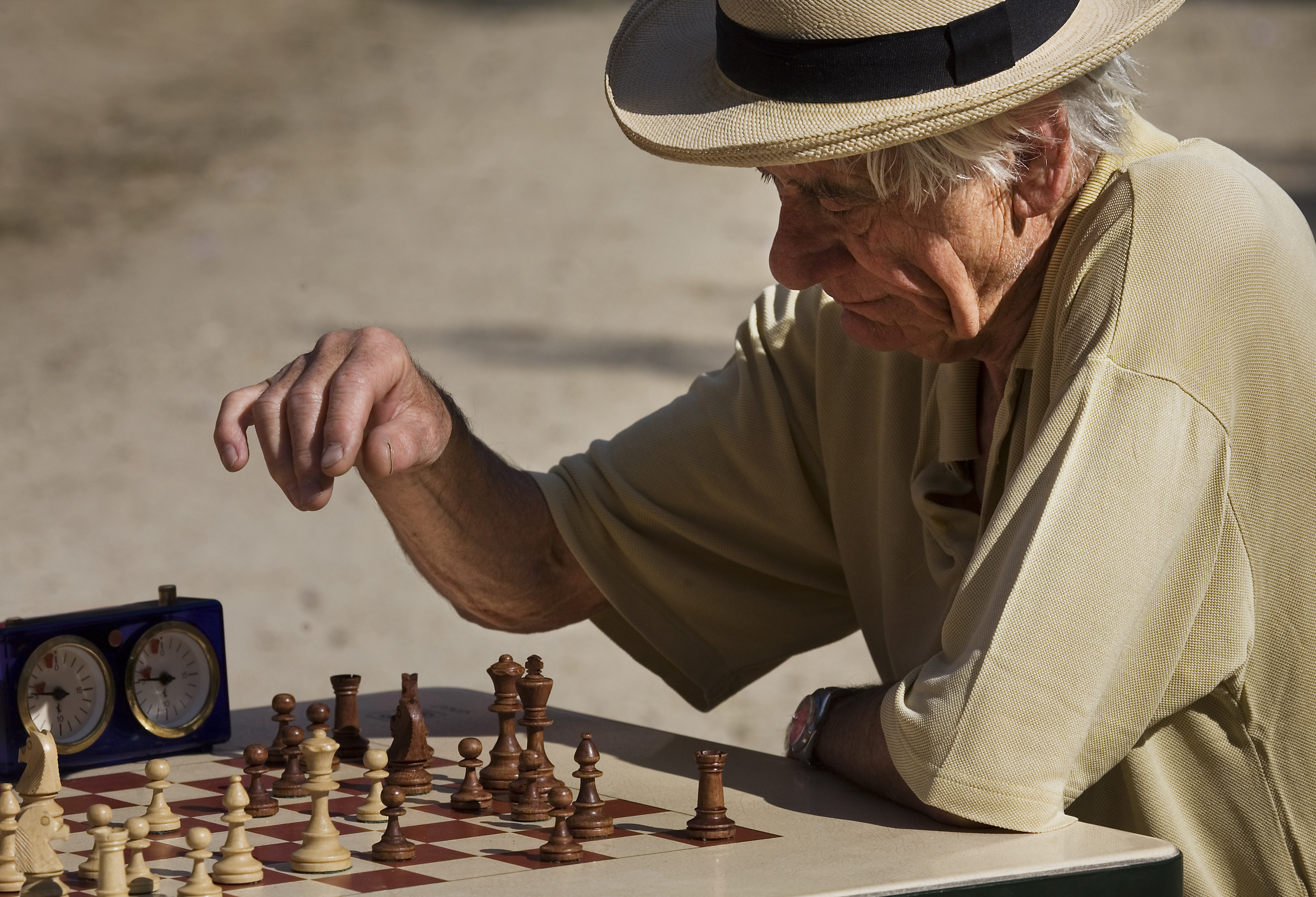
The intellect comprises the rational and the logical aspects of the human mind.

Intellect is a faculty of the human mind that enables reasoning, abstraction, conceptualization, and judgment. It enables the discernment of truth and falsehood, as well as higher-order thinking beyond immediate perception. Intellect is distinct from intelligence, which refers to the general ability to learn, adapt, and solve problems, whereas intellect concerns the application of reason to abstract or philosophical thought.

In philosophy, intellect (Ancient Greek: dianoia) has often been contrasted with nous, a term referring to the faculty of direct intuitive knowledge. While intellect engages in discursive reasoning, breaking down concepts into logical sequences, nous is considered a higher cognitive faculty that allows for direct perception of truth, especially in Platonism and Neoplatonism. Aristotle distinguished between the active intellect (intellectus agens), which abstracts universal concepts, and the passive intellect, which receives sensory input.

During late antiquity and the Middle Ages, the intellect was considered the bridge between the human soul and divine knowledge, particularly in religious and metaphysical contexts. Thinkers such as Thomas Aquinas and Averroes explored intellect as the means by which humans engage in higher reasoning and theological contemplation. This intellectual tradition influenced both Christian Scholasticism and Islamic philosophy, where intellect was linked to the understanding of divine truth.

In modern psychology and neuroscience, the term "intellect" is sometimes used to describe higher cognitive functions related to abstract thought and logical reasoning. However, contemporary research primarily focuses on general intelligence (g-factor) and cognitive abilities rather than intellect as a separate faculty. While theories such as Howard Gardner's theory of multiple intelligences address diverse ways of processing information, they do not equate directly to historical or philosophical notions of intellect.

== Etymology and meanings ==
In Platonism, dianoia (Greek: διάνοια) is the human cognitive capacity for, process of, or result of discursive reasoning, specifically about mathematical and technical subjects. It stands in contrast to the immediate, cognitive process of intuitive apprehension or noesis (noesis). (Note: In pharmacology, the term dianoia refers to a rare side effect of selective serotonin reuptake inhibitors where a significant disruption occurs simultaneously in the psychological state (hallucinations, delusions, paranoia) and the lower digestive tract.)

=== Intellect and intelligence ===
As a branch of intelligence, intellect primarily concerns the logical and rational functions of the human mind, emphasizing factual knowledge and analytical reasoning. Additional to the functions of linear logic and the patterns of formal logic the intellect also processes the non-linear functions of fuzzy logic and dialectical logic.

Intellect and intelligence are contrasted by etymology; derived from the Latin present active participle intelligere, the term intelligence denotes "to gather in between", whereas the term intellect, derived from the past participle of intelligere, denotes "what has been gathered". Therefore, intelligence relates to the creation of new categories of understanding, based upon similarities and differences, while intellect relates to understanding existing categories.

== In psychology ==
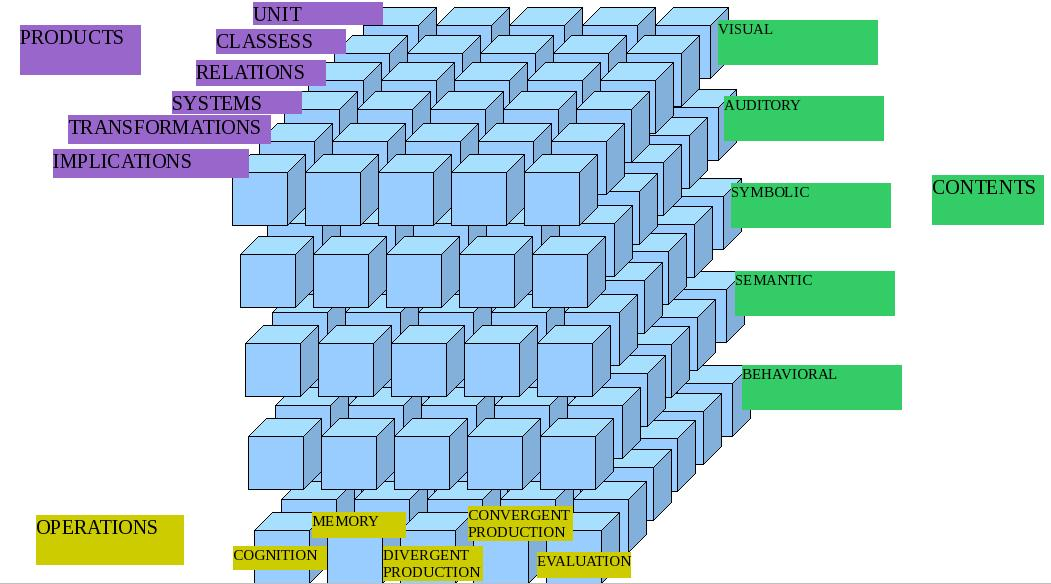
The Structure of Intellect (SI) model organizes intellectual functions in three dimensions: (i) Operations, (ii) Contents, and (iii) Products.

A person's intellectual understanding of reality derives from a conceptual model of reality based upon the perception and the cognition of the material world of reality. The conceptual model of mind is composed of the mental and emotional processes by which a person seeks, finds, and applies logical solutions to the problems of life. The full potential of the intellect is achieved when a person acquires a factually accurate understanding of the real world, which is mirrored in the mind. The mature intellect is identified by the person's possessing the capability of emotional self-management, wherein they can encounter, face, and resolve problems of life without being overwhelmed by emotion.

Real-world experience is necessary to and for the development of a person's intellect, because, in resolving the problems of life, a person can intellectually comprehend a social circumstance (a time and a place) and so adjust their social behavior in order to act appropriately in the society of other people. Intellect develops when a person seeks an emotionally satisfactory solution to a problem; mental development occurs from the person's search for satisfactory solutions to the problems of life. Only experience of the real world can provide understanding of reality, which contributes to the person's intellectual development.

=== Jung and the four cognitive functions ===
Carl Gustav Jung, the Swiss psychiatrist and founder of analytical psychology, offered a nuanced view of intellect and intuition within the human psyche. He acknowledged the importance of intellectual faculties for logical reasoning and understanding but cautioned against overreliance on intellect at the expense of other vital aspects of the psyche, such as intuition and emotion.

In Psychological Types (1923), Jung explored different modes of consciousness, including the role of intellect. He identified thinking as one of the primary psychological functions, which, when extraverted, is oriented by objective data and often recognized as the dominant mode in scientific and philosophical endeavors. He stated:

In this sense it might be said that the extraverted intellect, i.e. the mind that is orientated by objective data, is actually the only one recognized.

Jung also associated intellect with the thinking function in his model of psychological types. In contrast to feeling, sensation, and intuition, thinking relies on structured, rational cognition. While necessary for problem-solving and scientific inquiry, intellect alone cannot fully grasp the depths of the psyche or facilitate individuation—the process of becoming a whole and integrated self. He noted:

The faculty of directed thinking, I term intellect: the faculty of passive, or undirected, thinking, I term intellectual intuition.

This distinction reflects an influence from Platonic thought, where dianoia (discursive reasoning) is differentiated from noesis (direct apprehension or intuition). Jung expanded upon this by integrating these concepts into his psychological framework, emphasizing that both intellect and intuition are essential for a comprehensive understanding of the self and the world. For Jung, intellect had its place but needed to be balanced with intuitive and symbolic thought.

=== Guilford and the structure of intellect ===
In 1956, the psychologist Joy Paul Guilford (1897–1987) proposed a Structural Intellect (SI) model in three dimensions: (i) Operations, (ii) Contents, and (iii) Products. Each parameter contains specific, discrete elements that are individually measured as autonomous units of the human mind. Intellectual operations are represented by cognition and memory, production (by divergent thinking and convergent thinking), and evaluation. Contents are figurative and symbolic, semantic and behavioral. Products are in units, classes, and relations, systems, transformations, and implications.

== See also ==
- Cognitive development – Field of study in neuroscience and psychology
- Epistemology – Philosophical study of knowledge
- Human intelligence – Human capacity or ability to acquire, apprehend and apply knowledge
- Intellectualism – Mental perspective
- Intellectualization – Psychological defense mechanism
- Wisdom – Ability to apply knowledge with good judgment
