= Relation of Ideas =

In philosophy, a relation is a type of fact that is true or false of two things. For instance, "being taller than" is a relation that is true of "Shaquille O'Neal and Ross Perot" and false of "the Empire State building and Mt. Everest." Substances or things have properties ("this spot is red"). Relations on the other hand obtain between two substances ("this spot is bigger than that spot") or two properties ("this red is a darker shade than that red").

There are two major kinds of relations: ontological and epistemological. Ontological relations are entities like "father", which is a person considered in his relation to a child. Epistemological relations are often logical connections that obtain between two concepts or ideas, like "entailment." The fact that all men are mortal and that Socrates is a man entails that Socrates is mortal—the relation between Socrates' mortality and the mortality of all men is an entailment relation.

== Relations in modern philosophy ==
Relation of Ideas, in the Humean sense, is the type of knowledge that can be characterized as arising out of pure conceptual thought and logical operations (in contrast to a Matter of Fact). For instance, in mathematics: 8 x 10 = 80. Or in Logic: All islands are surrounded by water (by definition).

In Kantian philosophy, a relation is equivalent to the analytic a priori. Unlike Hume, Kant denied, in the introduction to his "Critique of Pure Reason", that mathematical truths were analytic. Rather, 'a bachelor is unmarried' is true by relation of the definitions of the concepts of 'bachelor' and 'unmarried.'

In Leibniz, relations of ideas are also similar to the so-called Truths of Reason, which are defined as those statements whose denials are self-contradictory.
