= Hume Society =

International philosophical society

The Hume Society
- Founder: James T. King et al.
- Established: 1974
- Mission: The promotion of research and scholarship on the philosophy and writings of David Hume
- Focus: History of philosophy, early modern philosophy
- Key people: Angela Coventry, Barry Stroud
- Location: International
- Website: humesociety.org

The Hume Society is an international philosophical society founded in 1974 to support scholarship on the thought and writings of the Scottish philosopher David Hume. The Hume Society publishes Hume Studies and is supported institutionally by Illinois Wesleyan University and St. Olaf College.

== Activities ==
- The Society organizes annual conferences featuring refereed papers on all aspects of Hume's philosophy.
- It publishes the peer-reviewed journal Hume Studies, issued twice per year (April and November).
- The Society awards Young Scholar prizes and supports an international Hume research community.

== Governance ==
The Hume Society is governed by an executive committee elected by its membership.
