= Carol J. White =

American philosopher

- Born: 1946; Anderson, Indiana
- Died: October 1, 2000 (aged 53–54)
- Awards: Graves Awards in the Humanities (1986)

Education
- Education: University of California, Berkeley (PhD)
- Doctoral advisor: Hubert Dreyfus

Philosophical work
- Institutions: Santa Clara University
- Main interests: Martin Heidegger, Soren Kierkegaard

Carol Jean White (1946 – October 1, 2000) was an American philosopher who was an associate professor in the Santa Clara University philosophy department. She was known for her works on Heidegger's philosophy.

== Books ==
- Time and Death: Heidegger's Analysis of Finitude, Edited by Mark Ralkowski, Foreword by Hubert L. Dreyfus, Ashgate 2005 (Routledge 2016)
- Faith in theory and practice: essays on justifying religious belief, Open Court 1993, edited with Elizabeth S. Radcliffe
