= A Treatise of Human Nature (Abstract) =

Summary of David Hume's Treatise on Human Nature

An Abstract of a Book lately Published, full title An Abstract of a Book lately Published; Entitled, A Treatise of Human Nature, &c. Wherein the Chief Argument of that Book is farther Illustrated and Explained is a summary of the main doctrines of David Hume's work A Treatise of Human Nature, published anonymously in 1740. There has been speculation about the authorship of the work. Some scholars believe it was written by Hume's friend, the economist Adam Smith. Most historians believe it was written by Hume himself, in an attempt to popularise the Treatise.

== Authorship dispute ==
In The Philosophical Quarterly in 1976, and again in Hume Studies 1991, J. O. Nelson challenged the received view that Hume wrote the Abstract, arguing that Adam Smith wrote it. His case depends on the identity of the 'Mr Smith' referred to in a letter of 4 March 1740 from Hume at Ninewells to Francis Hutcheson at Glasgow.

My Bookseller has sent to Mr Smith a Copy of my Book, which I hope he has receiv‘d, as well as your Letter. I have not yet heard what he has done with the Abstract. Perhaps you have. I have got it printed in London; but not in the Works of the Learned; there having been an article with regard to my Book, somewhat abusive, printed in that Work, before I sent up the Abstract?

Keynes and Sraffa argued that the "Mr Smith" was John Smith, Hutcheson’s Dublin publisher, and that Hume wrote the Abstract (as all the internal evidence suggests). Norman Kemp Smith, in a review of the Keynes and Sraffa edition, also accepted this, as well as pointing out the entry on Hume in Watkins Biographical Dictionary attributing authorship of the Abstract to Hume, suggesting that the author of the entry possessed inside information about Hume’s motives in publishing the Abstract. Nelson has argued that "Mr Smith" was Adam Smith (at that time, still a student). David Raynor has argued that all of the presently available internal and external evidence suggests that Hume wrote the Abstract.
