= Watkins Biographical Dictionary =

Watkins's Biographical Dictionary was originally published in 1800, with a second edition in 1825, as An Historical Account of the lives, characters and works of the most eminent persons in every age and nation, from the earliest times to the present. It was compiled by John Watkins, LL.D., and published by Longman, Rees, Orme, Brown and Green.

An Universal Biographical and Historical Dictionary (London, 1800) was a book written and published by John Watkins on academic figures, statesmen, and royalty. The dictionary went through several editions and was translated into several languages, including French and German.

== Entry on Hume ==
The dictionary is notable for its entry on the philosopher David Hume, which notes that "he published [the Treatise] in London in 1738, but its reception not answering his expectations, he printed a small analysis of it, in a sixpenny pamphlet, to make it sell". Because the pamphlet (An Abstract of the Treatise of Human Nature) was published anonymously, it is not known how the author of the article came by this information. Norman Kemp Smith has speculated that the firm of Longman's, which published both Watkins's Dictionary, and volume III of the A Treatise of Human Nature, was the channel through which the tradition of Hume's authorship of the Abstract was preserved.
