= Paul Russell (philosopher) =

Philosopher (born 1955)

- Born: 1955 (age 70–71)
- Occupation: Professor

Education
- Education: Edinburgh University, Cambridge University
- Thesis: Moral Sentiment and the Rationale of Responsibility (1986)
- Doctoral advisor: Bernard Williams

Philosophical work
- Institutions: University of British Columbia
- Language: English
- Notable works: Freedom and Moral Sentiment; The Riddle of Hume's Treatise; The Limits of Free Will; Recasting Hume and Early Modern Philosophy; Moral Responsibility: A Very Short Introduction
- Notable ideas: Philosophy of David Hume, Moral Responsibility

Paul Russell (born Glasgow, Scotland, 1955) is Emeritus Professor of Philosophy at the University of British Columbia.

He has also held a number of visiting appointments at various universities, including University of Virginia (1988); Stanford University (1989–1990), where he held a Mellon Fellowship; University of Pittsburgh (1996–1997); and University of North Carolina at Chapel Hill (2005), where he was Kenan Distinguished Visitor. In 2010 he was the Fowler Hamilton Visiting Fellow at Christ Church, Oxford and in 2023 he was Beaufort Visiting Fellow at St. John's College, Cambridge. From 2018-2025 he was also Professor of Philosophy at Lund University, where he was also Director of the Lund/Gothenburg Responsibility Project [LGRP]. Prior to that he was Professor of Philosophy at University of Gothenburg from 2015-2017.

== Education and research ==
Paul Russell holds an undergraduate degree from Edinburgh University (1979) and a PhD from Cambridge University (1986). At Cambridge he began his thesis on the Marxist theory of history and human freedom (and was supervised by G.A. Cohen, who was, at that time, at University College London). After the first year, his thesis interests began to focus on David Hume and issues of free will and moral repsonsibility. At that point his thesis work was supervised by Professor Sir Bernard Williams. He held a research fellowship at Sidney Sussex College, Cambridge from 1984 to 1987.

His principal research interests include problems of free will and moral responsibility and the history of early modern philosophy (particularly David Hume).

He is the author of Freedom and Moral Sentiment: Hume's Way of Naturalizing Responsibility (1995), The Riddle of Hume's Treatise: Skepticism, Naturalism, and Irreligion (2008), The Limits of Free Will: Selected Essays (2017), Recasting Hume and Early Modern Philosophy: Selected Essays, Moral Responsibility: A Very Short Introduction, all published by Oxford University Press. His book The Riddle of Hume's Treatise won the book prize from the Journal of the History of Philosophy in 2008, a prize bestowed on "the best published book in the history of philosophy." He has served on the editorial board of the journals Hume Studies and Journal of the History of Philosophy.

Along with his academic publications he has also published opinion pieces and reviews in a variety of venues including, The Globe and Mail, the Vancouver Sun, the Times Literary Supplement, The Scotsman, and Aeon. Selections of his work have been translated into several languages, including Chinese, Polish, Italian and Hungarian.

In recent years Paul Russell has commented on and discussed issues relating to free speech on the university campus, including at the University of British Columbia, where he called for denunciations of disliked ideas to be measured and responsible.

Paul Russell is a founding member of the European Moral Responsibility Consortium. He is currently the series editor for Free Will and Moral Responsibility in the Cambridge Elements.

== Awards ==
- 2023 Beaufort Visiting Fellow, St. John's College, Cambridge
- 2014 Swedish Research Council (Vetenskapsrådet), Grants for International Recruitment of Leading Researchers. [Awarded to the University of Gothenburg and Lund University, recruited as researcher. ]
- 2014 Killam Faculty Research Prize (UBC)
- 2010 Fowler Hamilton Visiting Fellow in the Humanities at Christ Church, Oxford
- 2010 Awarded the Journal of the History of Philosophy prize for the best published book in the history of philosophy in 2008 [The Riddle of Hume’s Treatise].
- 2007 Killam Teaching Prize (UBC)
- 1989 - 1990 Andrew W. Mellon Postdoctoral Fellowship, Stanford University
- 1984 - 1986 Research Fellowship, Sidney Sussex College, Cambridge

== Works ==
Books

- Moral Responsibility: A Very Short Introduction (Oxford University Press: 2026).
- Recasting Hume & Early Modern Philosophy: Selected Essays. New York (Oxford University Press: 2021).
- The Limits of Free Will: Selected Essays (Oxford University Press: 2017).
- The Riddle of Hume’s Treatise: Skepticism, Naturalism, and Irreligion (New York & Oxford: Oxford University Press: 2008). [Published in paperback 2010 with a new foreword.]
- Freedom and Moral Sentiment: Hume's Way of Naturalizing Responsibility (New York & Oxford: Oxford University Press, 1995). Published in paperback, 2002.

Books Introduced and Edited

- Hume's Dialogues Concerning Natural Religion: A Critical Guide. (Cambridge University Press: 2025).
- The Oxford Handbook of Hume. (Oxford University Press: 2016).
- The Philosophy of Free Will: Essential Readings from the Contemporary Debates, edited with Oisin Deery (Oxford University Press: 2013).
- Free Will and Reactive Attitudes: Perspectives on P.F. Strawson’s “Freedom and Resentment”, Introduced and edited with Michael McKenna (Farnham: Ashgate: 2008).[ Reissued and published in paperback by Routledge, 2016.]
- Joseph J. Russell, Analysis and Dialectic: Studies in the Logic of Foundation Problems, Introduced and edited by P. Russell (The Hague: Nijhoff, 1984).

Wrote Introductions For

- David Hume, Dialoger om naturlig religion [Nya Doxa, 2020] Swedish translation by Jan Landgren. The edition is provided with a newly written preface by Paul Russell.
