= Angela Coventry =

Australian philosopher

Education
- Education: University of Tasmania (BA), University of North Carolina at Chapel Hill (PhD)

Philosophical work
- Era: 21st-century philosophy
- Region: Western philosophy
- Institutions: Portland State University
- Main interests: early modern philosophy, David Hume
- Notable ideas: Scholarship on Hume’s naturalism and personal identity
- Website: https://www.pdx.edu/philosophy/profile/angela-coventry

Angela Michelle Coventry is an Australian philosopher and professor of philosophy at Portland State University. She is known for her work on David Hume, especially on causation, personal identity, and Humean natural ontology. Coventry has held the roles of Vice President and Executive Secretary‑Treasurer of the Hume Society, served as co-editor of the journal Hume Studies, and acted as the category editor for “David Hume” on PhilPapers.

== Books ==
- Coventry, Angela M. Hume’s Theory of Causation: A Quasi-Realist Interpretation. Bloomsbury, 2006.
- Coventry, Angela M. Hume: A Guide for the Perplexed. Bloomsbury, 2007; 2nd ed. 2012.
- Coventry, Angela M., and Andrew Valls (eds.). David Hume: Morals, Politics, and Society. Yale University Press, 2018.
- Coventry, Angela M., and Alex Sager (eds.). The Humean Mind. Routledge, 2019.
- Coventry, Angela M., and Kenneth Merrill. The Historical Dictionary of Hume’s Philosophy. Rowman & Littlefield, 2018.
- Coventry, Angela M. A Treatise of Human Nature (Broadview Press edition, as editor), 2023.
