= Essays, Moral, Political, and Literary =

1758 book by David Hume

Essays, Moral, Political, and Literary (1758) is a two-volume compilation of essays by David Hume. Part I includes the essays from Essays, Moral and Political, plus two essays from Four Dissertations. The content of this part largely covers political and aesthetic issues. Part II includes the essays from Political Discourses, most of which develop economic themes. The total two-part collection appeared within a larger collection of Hume's writings titled Essays and Treatises on Several Subjects. This was a collaborative publication with the important Scottish printer and publisher Alexander Kincaid, with whom the bookseller Andrew Millar had a lucrative but sometimes difficult relationship. There is a later edition.

== Contents ==
- My Own Life, by David Hume
- Letter from Adam Smith, L.L.D. to William Strahan, Esq.
- Part I, Essay I, OF THE DELICACY OF TASTE AND PASSION
- Part I, Essay II, OF THE LIBERTY OF THE PRESS
- Part I, Essay III, THAT POLITICS MAY BE REDUCED TO A SCIENCE
- Part I, Essay IV, OF THE FIRST PRINCIPLES OF GOVERNMENT
- Part I, Essay V, OF THE ORIGIN OF GOVERNMENT
- Part I, Essay VI, OF THE INDEPENDENCY OF PARLIAMENT
- Part I, Essay VII, WHETHER THE BRITISH GOVERNMENT INCLINES MORE TO ABSOLUTE MONARCHY, OR TO A REPUBLIC
- Part I, Essay VIII, OF PARTIES IN GENERAL
- Part I, Essay IX, OF THE PARTIES OF GREAT BRITAIN
- Part I, Essay X, OF SUPERSTITION AND ENTHUSIASM
- Part I, Essay XI, OF THE DIGNITY OR MEANNESS OF HUMAN NATURE
- Part I, Essay XII, OF CIVIL LIBERTY
- Part I, Essay XIII, OF ELOQUENCE
- Part I, Essay XIV, OF THE RISE AND PROGRESS OF THE ARTS AND SCIENCES
- Part I, Essay XV, THE EPICUREAN
- Part I, Essay XVI, THE STOIC
- Part I, Essay XVII, THE PLATONIST
- Part I, Essay XVIII, THE SCEPTIC
- Part I, Essay XIX, OF POLYGAMY AND DIVORCES
- Part I, Essay XX, OF SIMPLICITY AND REFINEMENT IN WRITING
- Part I, Essay XXI, OF NATIONAL CHARACTERS
- Part I, Essay XXII, OF TRAGEDY
- Part I, Essay XXIII, OF THE STANDARD OF TASTE
- Part II, Essay I, OF COMMERCE
- Part II, Essay II, OF REFINEMENT IN THE ARTS
- Part II, Essay III, OF MONEY
- Part II, Essay IV, OF INTEREST
- Part II, Essay V, OF THE BALANCE OF TRADE
- Part II, Essay VI, OF THE JEALOUSY OF TRADE
- Part II, Essay VII, OF THE BALANCE OF POWER
- Part II, Essay VIII, OF TAXES
- Part II, Essay IX, OF PUBLIC CREDIT
- Part II, Essay X, OF SOME REMARKABLE CUSTOMS
- Part II, Essay XI, OF THE POPULOUSNESS OF ANCIENT NATIONS
- Part II, Essay XII, OF THE ORIGINAL CONTRACT
- Part II, Essay XIII, OF PASSIVE OBEDIENCE
- Part II, Essay XIV, OF THE COALITION OF PARTIES
- Part II, Essay XV, OF THE PROTESTANT SUCCESSION
- Part II, Essay XVI, IDEA OF A PERFECT COMMONWEALTH
- Part III, Essay I, OF ESSAY-WRITING
- Part III, Essay II, OF MORAL PREJUDICES
- Part III, Essay III, OF THE MIDDLE STATION OF LIFE
- Part III, Essay IV, OF IMPUDENCE AND MODESTY
- Part III, Essay V, OF LOVE AND MARRIAGE
- Part III, Essay VI, OF THE STUDY OF HISTORY
- Part III, Essay VII, OF AVARICE
- Part III, Essay VIII, A CHARACTER OF SIR ROBERT WALPOLE
- Part III, Essay IX, OF SUICIDE
- Part III, Essay X, OF THE IMMORTALITY OF THE SOUL
