= Elizabeth S. Radcliffe =

Elizabeth S. Radcliffe is Professor of philosophy at William & Mary. She is the author of Hume, Passion, and Action, which discusses David Hume's views on passion's role in driving our actions and constituting our moral judgments. Simon Blackburn calls it "a beautifully judged, balanced, and therefore especially valuable addition to the literature."

Radcliffe is editor of A Companion to Hume, and co-editor of Late Modern Philosophy: Essential Readings with Commentary. She is co-editor of the journal Hume Studies, with Mark G. Spencer and president of the Hume Society from 2010 to 2012.

Before coming to William & Mary, Radcliffe was Professor of Philosophy at Santa Clara University. She has chaired each department. She received her MA and PhD from Cornell University in 1990. She has received two NEH Research Fellowships and an NEH Summer Stipend.
