= Mark G. Spencer =

Canadian academic

- Born: September 8, 1967 (age 59)
- Awards: FRHistS, FSAScot

Academic background
- Education: University of Western Ontario (PhD)

Academic work
- Discipline: history
- Institutions: Brock University
- Main interests: 18th-century British Atlantic world

Mark G. Spencer FRHistS FSA Scot (born 8 September 1967) is a Canadian historian and Professor of History at Brock University. He is known for his works on David Hume's life and thought. Spencer is a winner of Governor General's Gold Medal (The University of Western Ontario) and The John Bullen Prize of the Canadian Historical Association for his book David Hume and Eighteenth-Century America. He is co-editor with Elizabeth S. Radcliffe of Hume Studies.

== Books ==
- David Hume and Eighteenth-Century America (University of Rochester Press, 2005, reprinted 2010)
- John Beale Bordley’s ‘Necessaries’: An American Enlightenment Pamphlet in its Historical Contexts (American Philosophical Society, 2020)

=== Edited ===
- Hume’s Reception in Early America: Expanded Edition (New York, 2017)
- The Bloomsbury Encyclopedia of the American Enlightenment, 2 vols (New York and London, 2015)
- David Hume: Historical Thinker, Historical Writer (University Park: Pennsylvania State University Press, 2013)
- Ulster Presbyterians in the Atlantic World: Religion, Politics and Identity [with David A. Wilson] (Dublin, 2006)
- Utilitarians and Their Critics in America, 1789-1914, 4 vols [with James E. Crimmins] (Bristol and London, 2005)
- Hume’s Reception in Early America, 2 vols (Bristol, UK; originally distributed in North America by The University of Chicago Press, 2002)
- Essays on Hume's Life and Thought (Tehran: Naqde Farhang, 2025, in Persian)
