= John Watkins (writer) =

British writer

John Watkins (fl. 1792–1831) was an English miscellaneous writer, known as a biographer. He is most famous for being the author of An Universal Biographical and Historical Dictionary.

== Life ==
Born in Devon, he was educated at Bristol for the nonconformist ministry. Becoming dissatisfied, he conformed to the Church of England around 1786, with his friend Samuel Badcock, and for some years kept an academy in Devon. Watkins moved to London soon after beginning to write, probably about 1794. He became editor of the Orthodox Churchman's Magazine. His latest preface is dated 30 May 1831.

== Works ==
His first independent publication appeared in 1792, entitled An Essay towards the History of Bideford, 1792. Chapter x. consists of the depositions in a trial for witchcraft held at Exeter on 14 August 1682. The work was reprinted and published at Bideford in 1883. In 1796 appeared The Peeper: a collection of Essays, Moral, Biographical, and Literary (London, 1796; 2nd edit. London, 1811), dedicated to Hannah More. These were followed by a number of publications, some anonymous and some under his name. The most important of them was perhaps his Universal Biographical and Historical Dictionary, which appeared in 1800, London. It went through several editions, the last in 1827, and was translated into French, with additions, in 1803 by Jean Baptiste L'Écuy (fr).

Watkins also was the author of:

- A Letter to Earl Stanhope, in which … the Conduct of Great Britain and her Allies is Vindicated, 1794.
- A Word of Admonition to Gilbert Wakefield, occasioned by his Letter to William Wilberforce, 1797.
- Scripture Biography, 1801; several editions, latest 1830.
- Characteristic Anecdotes of Men of Learning and Genius, London, 1808.
- History of our Lord Jesus Christ Harmonised, 1810.
- Boydell's Heads of Illustrious and Celebrated Persons, with Memoirs, London, 1811.
- The Family Instructor, 1814, 3 vols.
- The Important Results of an Elaborate Investigation into the Case of Elizabeth Fenning, London, 1815.
- Memoirs of Sheridan, London, 1816; 3rd edit. 1818. This was the first life of Richard Brinsley Sheridan to appear. It seems to have been put together immediately after his death. It was in two volumes, and professed to describe Sheridan's private as well as his public life. Croker censured it in an article in the Quarterly Review.
- Memoirs of Queen Sophia Charlotte, London, 1819.
- Memoirs of the Life and Writings of Lord Byron, London, 1822; German translation, Leipzig, 1825.
- A Biographical Memoir of … Frederick, Duke of York and Albany, London, 1827.
- The Life and Times of “England's Patriot King,” William IV, London, 1831.

He translated from the Latin George Buchanan's History of Scotland, with a continuation, London, 1827, and wrote a memoir of Hugh Latimer, prefixed to his Sermons, London, 1824.
