= Four Dissertations =

Philosophical works

Four Dissertations is a collection of four essays by the 18th-century Scottish Enlightenment philosopher David Hume, first published in 1757. The four essays are:

1. The Natural History of Religion
2. Of the Passions
3. Of Tragedy
4. Of the Standard of Taste.

== The Natural History of Religion ==
In this essay, Hume offers a pioneering naturalist account of the causes, effects, and historical development of religious belief. Hume argues that a crude polytheism was the earliest religion of mankind and locates the origins of religion in emotion, particularly hope, fear, and the desire to control the future. He further argues that monotheism arises from competition between religions, as believers seek to distinguish their deities as superior to all rivals, magnifying those deities until they possess all perfections. Though an enlightened monotheism is more rationally defensible than a superstitious polytheism, in practice polytheism has many advantages. In particular, Hume argues, monotheistic religions tend to be more intolerant and hypocritical, result in greater intellectual absurdities, and foster socially undesirable "monkish virtues", such as mortification, abasement, and passive suffering.

Hume concludes the "Natural History" on a note of characteristic skepticism:

The whole is a riddle, an aenigma, an inexplicable mystery. Doubt, uncertainty, suspence of judgment appear the only result of our most accurate scrutiny, concerning this subject. But such is the frailty of human reason, and such the irresistible contagion of opinion, that even this deliberate doubt could scarcely be upheld; did we not enlarge our view, and opposing one species of superstition to another, set them a quarrelling; while we ourselves, during their fury and contention, happily make our escape, into the calm, though obscure, regions of philosophy.

In his autobiography, Hume comments that this essay's reception

was rather obscure, except only that Dr. Hurd wrote a pamphlet against it, with all the illiberal petulance, arrogance, and scurrility, which distinguish the Warburtonian school. This pamphlet gave me some consolation for the otherwise indifferent reception of my performance.

== Of the Passions ==
Hume begins the passions by giving a trite example of what Good and Evil are; Good being pleasure, Evil being pain. He then begins to analyze emotion as a reasoning faculty of the human mind. He argues that not only can emotions mix, they can also destroy one another. He also argues that our imagination and sentiments combine to create an impression of something/someone. For example, you see your grade on a test and it is good, you then attribute that good grade to having a good teacher, and even maybe an interest in the class as well. Hume tries to exclude religion from our reasoning faculty of right and wrong in that we make our decisions based on the over-riding passion during that moment. Your wife may divorce you, but I bet winning the lottery would make you forget about it. He concludes by saying that this mixture of emotion and sentiments give rise to hope and fear, which gives rise to religion in ancient society.

== Of Tragedy ==
Of Tragedy is where Hume considered why we enjoy tragic drama. He was concerned with why spectators find pleasure in the sorrow and anxiety depicted in a tragedy. He decided that this was because the spectator is aware that he is witnessing a dramatic performance. There is pleasure in realizing that the terrible events that are being shown are actually fiction.

Hume focuses on tragedy and its relationship with passions. So far Hume's view on this relationship has been formulated in many different ways, one of which is Hume's conversion theory. According to this theory, painful passions are turned into pleasurable ones using stylistic and formal rhetorical means. This view has been constantly proved, disproved, edited and changed by either its supporters or its critics. However, in most cases, the supporters or the critics agree that tragedy induces pleasure using poetic or rhetorical and stylistic means.

== Of the Standard of Taste ==
Of the Standard of Taste was a seminal essay on aesthetics that is innovative because it requires Hume to address the apparent relativity of taste, a conclusion that appears to follow from his own assumption that the "good" or "beauty" of a good work of art is identical with the positive human responses it generates. The essay's focus on the subject (the viewer, the reader) rather than the object (the painting, the book) is typical of the British "sentimentalists" or moral sense theorists of the eighteenth century. Unlike the French philosophers of the 18th century, who sought an objective definition of beauty, the British school tended to look for the connections between taste and aesthetic judgments.

=== Summary ===
Hume begins with the observation that there is much variety in people's taste (or the aesthetic judgments people make). However, Hume argues that there is a common mechanism in human nature that gives rise to, and often even provides justification for, such judgments. He takes this aesthetic sense to be quite similar to the moral sense for which he argues in his Book 3 of A Treatise of Human Nature (1739–1740) and in An Enquiry Concerning the Principles of Morals (1751). Furthermore, he argues that this still leaves room for the ability to refine one's aesthetic palate (Fieser, 2006, §2).

Hume took as his premise that the great diversity and disagreement regarding matters of taste had two basic sources – sentiment, which was to some degree naturally varying, and critical facility, which could be cultivated. Each person is a combination of these of two sources, and Hume endeavours to delineate the admirable qualities of a critic, that they might augment their natural sense of beauty into a reliable faculty of judgment. There are a variety of qualities of the good critic that he describes, each of which contributes to an ultimately reliable and just ability to judge.

== References and further reading ==
- Fieser, James (2006). "David Hume - Essays, Moral, Political and Literary", The Internet Encyclopedia of Philosophy, J. Fieser & B. Dowden (eds.).
- Gracyk, Theodore (2004). "Hume on Taste and the Arts ", academic web page.
- Gracyk, Ted (2006). "Hume's Aesthetics", The Stanford Encyclopedia of Philosophy (Winter 2006 Edition), Edward N. Zalta (ed.).
