= Hume Studies =

- Discipline: Philosophy
- Language: English
- Edited by: Elizabeth S. Radcliffe, Mark G. Spencer

Publication details
- History: 1975–present
- Publisher: Hume Society
- Frequency: Biannual
- Open access: Vols. 1-30

Standard abbreviations
- ISO 4: Hume Stud.

Indexing
- ISSN: 0319-7336 (print); 1947-9921 (web)
- LCCN: 2009202675
- OCLC no.: 2442960

Links
- Journal homepage

Hume Studies is an interdisciplinary journal that publishes articles on the philosophical thought of David Hume. It is published by the Hume Society in April and November issues. There is open access to the journal's first 30 volumes, which are available in their issue archive. Members of the Hume Society have online access to all volumes.

== See also ==
- List of philosophy journals
