= David Hume =

Scottish philosopher, historian, economist and essayist (1711–1776)

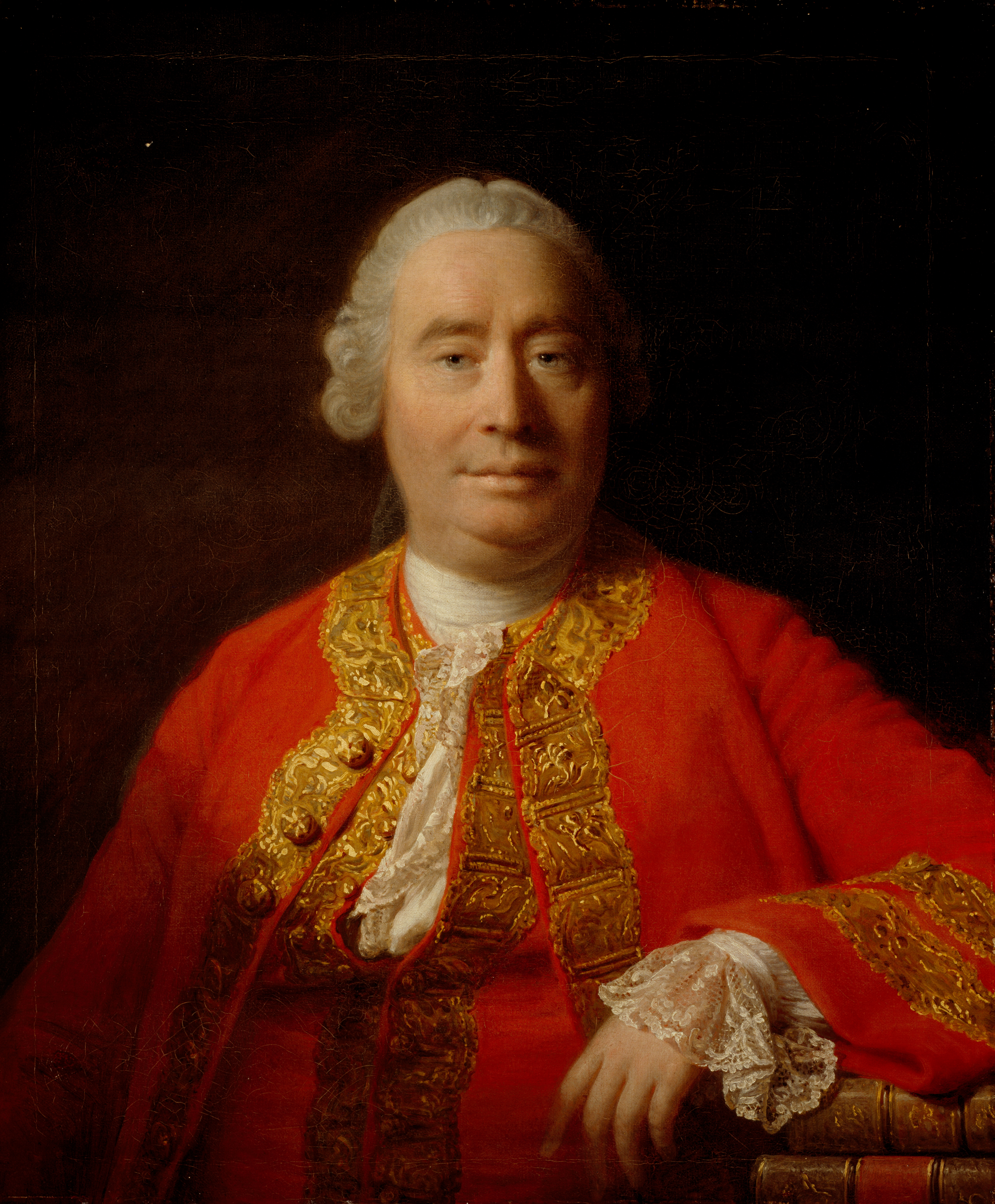
- Portrait of David Hume by Allan Ramsay, 1766
- Born: David Home; 7 May [26 April OS] 1711; Lawnmarket, Edinburgh, Scotland
- Died: 25 August 1776 (aged 65); New Town, Edinburgh, Scotland

Education
- Education: University of Edinburgh (attended)

Philosophical work
- Era: Enlightenment
- Region: Scottish philosophy
- School: Scottish Enlightenment; Humeanism; Naturalism; Skepticism; Empiricism; Irreligion; Foundationalism; Newtonianism; Conceptualism; Indirect realism; Correspondence theory of truth; Moral sentimentalism
- Main interests: Aesthetics; Economics; Epistemology; Ethics; Metaphysics; Philosophy of mind; Philosophy of religion; Political philosophy
- Notable ideas: List: Problem of causation; Problem of induction; Constant conjunction; Bundle theory; Association of ideas; Inertness of reason; Is–ought problem; Fact–value distinction; Impression–idea distinction; Personal Identity; Hume's fork; Deductive and inductive reasoning; Science of man; Moral sentiments; The Missing Shade of Blue

David Hume (/hjuːm/; born David Home; 7 May 1711 – 25 August 1776) was a Scottish philosopher, historian, economist and essayist who is known for his highly influential system of empiricism, philosophical scepticism and metaphysical naturalism. Beginning with A Treatise of Human Nature (1739–40), Hume strove to create a naturalistic science of man that examined the psychological basis of human nature. Following John Locke, Hume rejected the existence of innate ideas, holding that all our ideas derive ultimately from impressions, but in his fork he distinguished relations of ideas, known a priori, from matters of fact, whose knowledge rests on experience. This places him in the empiricist tradition of Locke and George Berkeley, while drawing his experimental method from Francis Bacon.

Hume argued that inductive reasoning and belief in causality cannot be justified empirically; instead, they result from custom and mental habit. People never actually perceive that one event causes another but experience only the "constant conjunction" of events. This problem of induction means that to draw any causal inferences from past experience, it is necessary to presuppose that the future will resemble the past; this metaphysical presupposition cannot itself be grounded in prior experience.

An opponent of philosophical rationalists, Hume held that passions rather than reason govern human behaviour, proclaiming that "Reason is, and ought only to be the slave of the passions." Hume was also a sentimentalist who held that ethics are based on emotion or sentiment rather than abstract moral principle. He maintained an early commitment to naturalistic explanations of moral phenomena and is usually accepted by historians of European philosophy to have first clearly expounded the is–ought problem, or the idea that a statement of fact alone can never give rise to a normative conclusion of what ought to be done.

Hume denied that people have an actual conception of the self, positing that they experience only a bundle of sensations and that the self is nothing more than this bundle of perceptions connected by an association of ideas. Hume's compatibilist theory of free will takes causal determinism as fully compatible with human freedom. His philosophy of religion, including his rejection of miracles and critique of the argument from design, was especially controversial.

During his lifetime, Hume was chiefly known as a historian and essayist, as his History of England became a bestseller, while his Treatise initially received little notice and his supposed atheism saw him passed over for university chairs. Hume left a legacy that affected utilitarianism, logical positivism, the philosophy of science, early analytic philosophy, cognitive science, theology and many other fields and thinkers. Immanuel Kant credited Hume as the inspiration that had awakened him from his "dogmatic slumbers".

== Biography ==
=== Early life and education ===
David Hume was born on 7 May 1711 [OS 26 April 1711] as David Home in a tenement on the north side of Edinburgh's Lawnmarket. He was the second of two sons born to Catherine Home (née Falconer, daughter of Sir David Falconer of Newton, Midlothian, and his wife Mary Falconer (née Norvell)), and Joseph Home of Chirnside in the County of Berwick, an advocate of Ninewells. Joseph died just after David's second birthday. Catherine, who never re-married, raised the two brothers and their sister on her own. David's uncle George Home was minister at the parish in Chirnside where he likely attended during his youth.

Hume changed his family name's spelling in 1734 because the surname 'Home' (pronounced 'Hume') was not well known in England. Hume never married and lived partly at his Chirnside family home in Berwickshire, which had belonged to the family since the 16th century. His finances as a young man were very "slender", as his family was not rich; as a younger son he had little patrimony to live on.

Hume attended the University of Edinburgh at an unusually early age—either 12 or possibly as young as 10—at a time when 14 was the typical age. Initially, Hume considered a career in law, because of his family. However, in his words, he came to have:

an insurmountable aversion to everything but the pursuits of Philosophy and general Learning; and while [my family] fanceyed I was poring over Voet and Vinnius, Cicero and Virgil were the Authors which I was secretly devouring.

He had little respect for the professors of his time, telling a friend in 1735 that "there is nothing to be learnt from a Professor, which is not to be met with in Books". He did not graduate.

==== "Disease of the learned" ====
At around age 18, Hume made a philosophical discovery that opened up to him "a new Scene of Thought", inspiring him "to throw up every other Pleasure or Business to apply entirely to it". As he did not recount what this scene exactly was, commentators have offered a variety of speculations. One prominent interpretation among contemporary Humean scholarship is that this new "scene of thought" was Hume's realisation that Francis Hutcheson's theory of moral sense could be applied to the understanding of morality as well.

From this inspiration, Hume set out to spend a minimum of 10 years reading and writing. He soon came to the verge of a mental breakdown, first starting with a coldness—which he attributed to a "Laziness of Temper"—that lasted about nine months. Scurvy spots later broke out on his fingers, persuading Hume's physician to diagnose him with the "Disease of the Learned".

Hume wrote that he "went under a Course of Bitters and Anti-Hysteric Pills", taken along with a pint of claret every day. He also decided to have a more active life to better continue his learning. His health improved somewhat, but in 1731, he was afflicted with a ravenous appetite and palpitations. After eating well for a time, he went from being "tall, lean and raw-bon'd" to being "sturdy, robust [and] healthful-like." Indeed, Hume would become well known for being obese and having a fondness for good port and cheese, often using them as philosophical metaphors for his conjectures.

=== Career ===
Despite having noble ancestry, Hume had no source of income and no learned profession by age 25. As was common at his time, he became a merchant's assistant, despite having to leave his native Scotland. He travelled via Bristol to La Flèche in Anjou, France. There he had frequent discourse with the Jesuits of the College of La Flèche and is likely to have used the college's extensive library.

Hume was derailed in his attempts to start a university career by protests over his alleged "atheism", also lamenting that his literary debut, A Treatise of Human Nature, "fell dead-born from the press". However, he found literary success in his lifetime as an essayist and historian, and a career as a librarian at the Advocates Library for the Faculty of Advocates. These successes provided him much needed income at the time. His tenure there, and the access to research materials it provided, resulted in Hume's writing the massive six-volume The History of England, which became a bestseller and the definitive history of England. For over 60 years, Hume was the dominant interpreter of English history. He described his "love for literary fame" as his "ruling passion" and judged his two late works, the so-called "first" and "second" enquiries, An Enquiry Concerning Human Understanding and An Enquiry Concerning the Principles of Morals, as his greatest literary and philosophical achievements. He would ask of his contemporaries to judge him on the merits of the later texts alone, rather than on the more radical formulations of his early, youthful work, dismissing his philosophical debut as juvenilia: "A work which the Author had projected before he left College." Despite Hume's protestations, a consensus exists today that his most important arguments and philosophically distinctive doctrines are found in the original form they take in the Treatise. Though he was only 23 years old when starting this work, it is now regarded as one of the most important in the history of Western philosophy.

==== 1730s ====
Hume worked for four years on his first major work, A Treatise of Human Nature, subtitled "Being an Attempt to Introduce the Experimental Method of Reasoning into Moral Subjects", completing it in 1738 at age 27. Books 1 and 2 of his treatise were intended to "try the taste of the public", leading to Book 3 Of Morals being published after his feeling that he had "met with success".

Although many scholars today consider the Treatise to be Hume's most important work and one of the most important books in Western philosophy, critics in Great Britain at the time described it as "abstract and unintelligible". As Hume had spent most of his savings during those four years, he resolved "to make a very rigid frugality supply [his] deficiency of fortune, to maintain unimpaired [his] independency, and to regard every object as contemptible except the improvements of [his] talents in literature".

Despite the disappointment, Hume later wrote: "Being naturally of a cheerful and sanguine temper, I soon recovered from the blow and prosecuted with great ardour my studies in the country." There, in an attempt to make his larger work better known and more intelligible, he published the An Abstract of a Book lately Published as a summary of the main doctrines of the Treatise, without revealing its authorship. This work contained the same ideas, but with a shorter and clearer explanation. Although there has been some academic speculation as to the pamphlet's true author, it is generally regarded as Hume's creation.

==== 1740s ====
The Essays Moral and Political was published in 1741, included in the later edition as Essays, Moral, Political, and Literary. In 1745, Hume applied for the Chair of Pneumatics and Moral Philosophy at the University of Edinburgh. However, the position was given to William Cleghorn after Edinburgh ministers petitioned the town council not to appoint Hume because he was seen as an atheist.

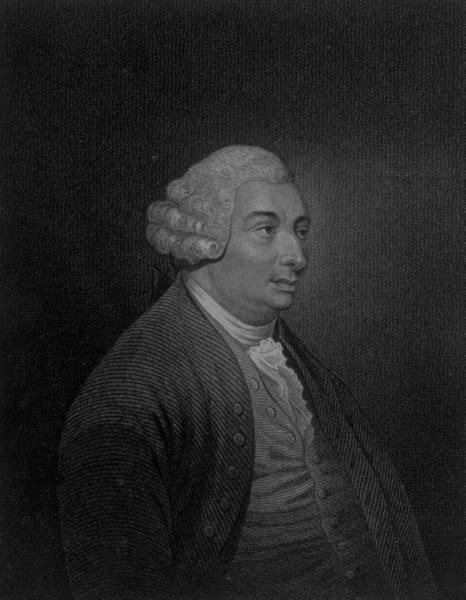
An engraving of Hume from the first volume of his The History of England, 1754

In 1745, during the Jacobite risings, Hume tutored the Marquess of Annandale, an engagement that ended in disarray after about a year. The Marquess could not follow with Hume's lectures, his father saw little need for philosophy, and on a personal level, the Marquess found Hume's dietary tendencies to be bizarre.

In 1746 Hume accepted an invitation from his cousin, Lieutenant-General James St Clair, to serve as his secretary. St Clair was shortly afterwards given command of a military expedition, originally conceived as an attack on French Canada, but abandoned as too late in the year for an Atlantic crossing and redirected into an amphibious assault on the coast of Brittany. The resulting Raid on Lorient (29 September – 10 October 1746) aimed to seize the port of the French East India Company and draw French forces away from Flanders, but the ill-supplied force withdrew after a brief siege, reportedly just as the town was preparing to capitulate. Hume, who accompanied the expedition throughout, later wrote a mordant account. In 1748 he again served St Clair as secretary, this time on military embassies to the courts of Vienna and Turin, later recalling that he "wore the uniform of an officer".

At that time Hume wrote Philosophical Essays Concerning Human Understanding, later published as An Enquiry Concerning Human Understanding. Often called the First Enquiry, it proved little more successful than the Treatise. By the end of this period Hume had attained his well-known corpulent stature; "the good table of the General and the prolonged inactive life had done their work", leaving him "a man of tremendous bulk".

In 1749 he went to live with his brother in the countryside, although he continued to associate with the aforementioned Scottish Enlightenment figures.

==== 1750s–1760s ====
Hume's religious views were often suspect and, in the 1750s, it was necessary for his friends to avert a trial against him on the charge of heresy, specifically in an ecclesiastical court. However, he "would not have come and could not be forced to attend if he said he was not a member of the Established Church". Hume failed to gain the chair of philosophy at the University of Glasgow due to his religious views. By this time he had published the Philosophical Essays, which were decidedly anti-religious. This represented a turning point in his career and the various opportunities made available to him. Even Adam Smith, his personal friend who had vacated the Glasgow philosophy chair, was against his appointment out of concern that public opinion would be against it. In 1761 all his works were banned on the Index Librorum Prohibitorum.

Hume returned to Edinburgh in 1751, and in the following year the Faculty of Advocates hired him to be their Librarian, a job in which he would receive little to no pay, but which nonetheless gave him "the command of a large library". (Note: "The Faculty of Advocates chose me their Librarian, an office from which I received little or no emolument, but which gave me the command of a large library." (Hume 1776:11).) This resource enabled him to continue historical research for The History of England. Hume's volume of Political Discourses, written in 1749 and published by Kincaid & Donaldson in 1752, was the only work he considered successful on first publication.

In 1752, Hume started his great historical work, The History of England, which took fifteen years and ran to over a million words. During this time, he was also involved with the Canongate Theatre through his friend John Home, a preacher. In this context, he associated with Lord Monboddo and other thinkers of the Scottish Enlightenment in Edinburgh.

In 1753 Hume moved from his house on Riddles Court on the Lawnmarket to a house on the Canongate at the other end of the Royal Mile. Here he lived in a tenement known as Jack's Land, immediately west of the still-surviving Shoemakers Land.

Eventually, with the publication of his six-volume The History of England between 1754 and 1762, Hume achieved the fame that he coveted. The volumes traced events from the Invasion of Julius Caesar to the Revolution of 1688 and was a bestseller in its day. Hume was also a longtime friend of the bookseller Andrew Millar, who sold Hume's History (after acquiring the rights from the Scottish bookseller Gavin Hamilton), although the relationship was sometimes complicated. Letters between them illuminate both men's interest in the success of the History. In 1762 Hume moved from Jack's Land on the Canongate to James Court on the Lawnmarket. He sold the house to James Boswell in 1766.

=== Later life ===
==== Paris and Rousseau ====
From 1763 to 1765 Hume was invited to attend Lord Hertford in Paris, where he became secretary to the British embassy in France. Hume was well received among Parisian society, and while there he met Isaac de Pinto. In 1765 Hume served as a chargé d'affaires in Paris, writing "despatches to the British Secretary of State". He wrote of his Paris life, "I really wish often for the plain roughness of The Poker Club of Edinburgh… to correct and qualify so much lusciousness."

In January 1766 Hume left Paris to accompany Jean-Jacques Rousseau to England. Once there, he and Rousseau fell out, leaving Hume sufficiently worried about the damage to his reputation from the quarrel with Rousseau that he would author an account of the dispute, titling it "A concise and genuine account of the dispute between Mr. Hume and Mr. Rousseau".

==== Slavery ====
In 2014 the University of Cambridge academic Felix Waldmann published a previously unknown letter from Hume to his patron Francis Seymour-Conway, Lord Hertford of 20 March 1766, in which Hume communicated a proposal to Hertford from George Colebrooke, Sir James Cockburn and John Stewart to acquire a half-share of slave plantations in Grenada, an island ceded to Britain after the Treaty of Paris (1763) with the other Windward Islands.

"To day, Sir George Colebroke spoke to me of a Business, which he desird me to communicate to your Lordship. It seems Sir George, with two Partners, Sir James Cockburn & Mr Stewart the Wine Merchant, had a great Undertaking in Dominica, to which Place they sent over an Overseer, one Mr Nalson, a very honest Man and a Man of Substance. Mr Nalson was oblig'd on some Affair to go to the Granadoes, where the Offer of the most advantageous Bargain, that had been made for a long time in America, had engagd him to make in their Name & his own a Purchase of some Plantations to the Amount of 60.000 Pounds Sterling. They had no Intention to have gone farther than the first Project but rather than the poor Man shoud be ruind or hurt by his Rashness, they were willing to take the half of the Bargain. Hearing that your Lordship had once entertaind Thoughts of making some Purchase in these new Conquests, [deleted: they] Sir George desird me to make an Offer in his Name of the other half, which may be manag'd by common Stock and at common Risque with him and his Partners. As these People are Men of Substance and Character, I thought it possible that your Lordship might give Ear to this Proposal; and if your Lordship think it worthy of your Attention, Sir George says, that he will write you a full Relation of the whole. He read me Nalson's Letter, by which it appears, that this Purchase is much more advantageous, than that made by Mr Maclane which it seems your Lordship declin'd." — David Hume to Francis Seymour Conway, Lord Hertford, 20 March 1766

Waldmann observed that the previously unknown letter explicated a letter of 20 June 1766 among Hume's papers in the National Library of Scotland, until then miscatalogued as a letter from a man named "d'Ennesy", but in fact from the Governor of Martinique, Victor-Thérèse Charpentier (1732–76), marquis d'Ennery. In the letter, d'Ennery thanked Hume for a letter of 2 February 1766 on behalf of Stewart, Nelson and possibly Alexander Burnet of Grenada (d. 1790), all evidently involved in the purchase of slave plantations:

"jay recu la lettre que vous m'avez fait l'honneur de m'ecrire de londres le 2 fevrier de cette anneé pour me recomander les interets de M. Stewart representêz par Mrs. Nelson et Burnet; je leur rendray, vous pouvez en etre assuré tous les services qui dependront de moy, ils y peuvent compter, je le leur ay dit" [Translation: I have received the letter you did me the honor of writing to me from London on the 2nd of February of this year to recommend to me the interests of Mr. Stewart, represented by Messrs. Nelson and Burnet. I will render them, you may be assured, all the services that depend on me; they can count on it, and I have told them so.] — Victor-Thérèse Charpentier, marquis d'Ennery to David Hume, 20 June 1766

As Waldmann noted, Hume's Coutts Bank ledger records that he lent £400 to Stewart on 8 February 1766 and "it is not inconceivable that this money was invested in a plantation". On 25 June 1766, Hume received £6 3s 4d interest for a loan of "4 mon: 19 days" from "Archibald Stewart & Co.", the firm that John Stewart co-administered with his father Archibald Stewart (Lord Provost). An indenture for a plantation purchased by Stewart, Nelson and Colebrooke in Grenada reveals that it held 42 slaves by 3 November 1767. As Waldmann recorded, the evidence of Hume's involvement in the slave trade was considerably clearer than the biographical tradition that had associated his early employment in Bristol with a sugar merchant.

Contrary to Waldmann's claims, Peter Hutton and David Ashton have asserted that "nowhere—absolutely nowhere—in this letter does Hume 'encourage' Lord Hertford to buy…". Alan Bailey similarly suggests: "it is plain that it is Sir George, rather than Hume, who is intent on persuading Lord Hertford to invest". Hutton and Ashton claim that Hertford chose not to invest in the plantations, but there is no extant evidence of Hertford's response.

James Fieser contends that Hume goes beyond merely conveying information: that, by vouching for the partners as 'Men of Substance and Character', attesting to their integrity, Hume "adds to the merit of the deal by essentially putting his own reputation at stake". Moreover, in suggesting that the opportunity was more financially "advantageous" than a previous plantation investment considered by Hertford, "his letter reads more like Hume is encouraging the purchase, rather than just dutifully conveying Colebrook's offer".

Commenting on Hume's letter to d'Ennery, Hutton and Ashton, noting that Hume's letter is no longer extant, point out that it is not known what he wrote, and assert that the reply "provides no evidence to suggest that Hume was actively attempting to facilitate investment in a plantation" and that Hume "may have simply been providing confirmation of Stewart's personal integrity". They also assert that "Waldmann's (2020) insinuation" that money provided by Hume was "used to aid the purchase of a slave plantation, is a baseless speculation" and suggest it was most likely intended to assist in the purchase of a property for Rousseau; however, they do not provide evidence for this claim or refer to the status of the money provided to Stewart as a loan at commercial interest.

Fieser notes that the "precise service that d'Ennery performed for Stewart and his representatives" is a matter of speculation, and any documentation "that explicitly states the intended purpose of Hume's loan to Stewart" is not extant. Fieser does, however, observe that "the timing of the loan and Hume's letter to d'Ennery are too close for us to reasonably think it was for a different project"; the loan to Stewart of "approximately £75,000" in 2022 currency, repaid with interest of "approximately £1,000", "was likely more of a loan to a friend rather than as a pure business venture", although, as Waldmann first acknowledged, "the purpose of the loan is not recorded".

Bailey notes that "nothing in the letter [to Hertford] indicates that Hume… had any pecuniary interest in the matter" and, he contends, there is "no compelling evidence" that Hume ever "personally profited… from the institution of plantation slavery". However, Waldmann has argued that "Hume sought to benefit" from slavery, a reference to Hertford's role as Hume's patron and his brother Henry Seymour Conway's role as Hume's employer; by 1769 the family had procured a substantial pension for Hume.

Bailey describes Hume's March letter to Lord Hertford as the document that "comes closest to raising serious doubts about the sincerity of Hume's published disavowals of chattel slavery". He suggests that the letter "might perhaps be seen as an instance of Hume allowing social convention and his personal obligations… to lure him into an inappropriate degree of collusion with this scheme". Danielle Charette describes the incident as one of "personal hypocrisy".

As to the charge of racism, based on the footnote Hume appended to his essay "On National Characters" in 1753, and had amended as an endnote for a posthumous 1777 edition, Hutton and Ashton acknowledge that its content is "especially shocking—and deeply puzzling". Bailey describes it as "highly prejudicial speculation". Fieser suggests that independent scholar Kendra Asher's discussion "is the only one to date suggesting that the footnote might not represent Hume's true views". Fieser suggests that Asher's interpretation "must be taken seriously", but stresses the need to "address head on" the indications that Hume both 'encouraged' and 'assisted' friends in the investment in a slave plantation.

==== Final years ====
In 1767 Hume was appointed Under Secretary of State for the Northern Department. Here, he wrote that he was given "all the secrets of the Kingdom". In 1769 he returned to James's Court in Edinburgh, but in 1771 moved into a grand new house on St Andrew Square, where he lived until his death in 1776.

Hume's nephew and namesake, David Hume of Ninewells (1757–1838), was a co-founder of the Royal Society of Edinburgh in 1783. He was a Professor of Scots Law at Edinburgh University and rose to be Principal Clerk of Session in the Scottish High Court and Baron of the Exchequer. He is buried with his uncle in Old Calton Cemetery.

==== Autobiography ====
In the last year of his life, Hume wrote an extremely brief autobiographical essay titled "My Own Life", summing up his entire life in "fewer than 5 pages"; it contains many judgements that have been of enduring interest to subsequent readers of Hume. Donald Seibert (1984), a scholar of 18th-century literature, judged it a "remarkable autobiography, even though it may lack the usual attractions of that genre. Anyone hankering for startling revelations or amusing anecdotes had better look elsewhere."

Despite condemning vanity as a dangerous passion, in his autobiography Hume confesses his belief that the "love of literary fame" had served as his "ruling passion" in life, and claims that this desire "never soured my temper, notwithstanding my frequent disappointments". One such disappointment Hume discusses in this account is in the initial literary reception of the Treatise, which he claims to have overcome by means of the success of the Essays: "the work was favourably received, and soon made me entirely forget my former disappointment". Hume, in his own retrospective judgement, argues that his philosophical debut's apparent failure "had proceeded more from the manner than the matter". He thus suggests that "I had been guilty of a very usual indiscretion, in going to the press too early."

Hume also provides an unambiguous self-assessment of the relative value of his works: that "my Enquiry concerning the Principles of Morals; which, in my own opinion (who ought not to judge on that subject) is of all my writings, historical, philosophical, or literary, incomparably the best." He also wrote of his social relations: "My company was not unacceptable to the young and careless, as well as to the studious and literary", noting of his complex relation to religion, as well as to the state, that "though I wantonly exposed myself to the rage of both civil and religious factions, they seemed to be disarmed in my behalf of their wonted fury". He goes on to profess of his character: "My friends never had occasion to vindicate any one circumstance of my character and conduct." Hume concludes the essay with a frank admission:

I cannot say there is no vanity in making this funeral oration of myself, but I hope it is not a misplaced one; and this is a matter of fact which is easily cleared and ascertained.

=== Death ===
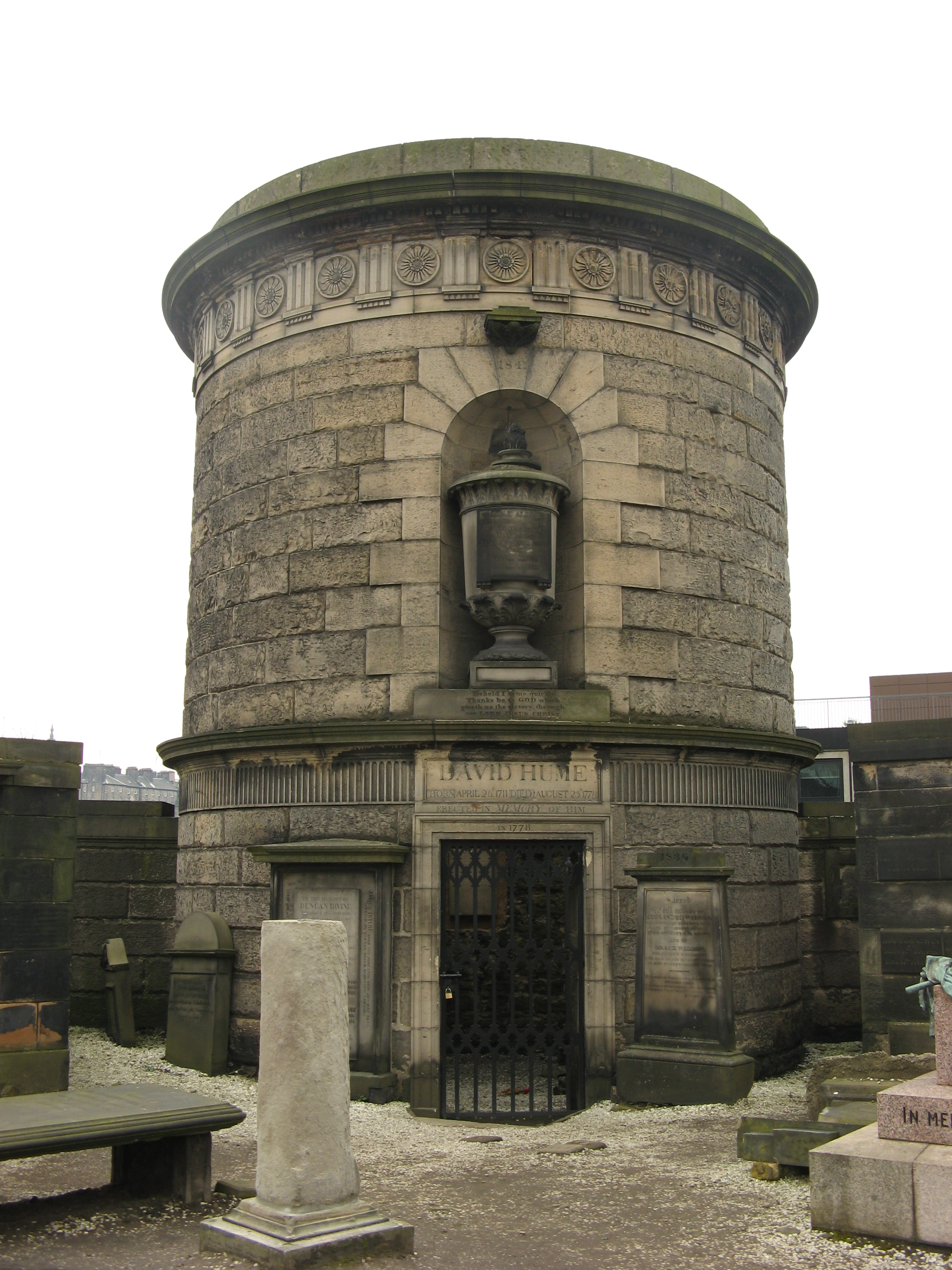
David Hume's mausoleum by Robert Adam in the Old Calton Burial Ground, Edinburgh

The diarist and biographer James Boswell saw Hume a few weeks before his death from a form of abdominal cancer. Hume told him that he sincerely believed it a "most unreasonable fancy" that there might be life after death. Hume asked for his body to be interred in a "simple Roman tomb", requesting in his will for it to be inscribed only with his name and the year of his birth and death, "leaving it to Posterity to add the Rest".

Hume died at the southwest corner of St Andrew's Square in Edinburgh's New Town, at what is now 21 Saint David Street. A popular story, consistent with some historical evidence and with the help of coincidence, suggests that the street was named after Hume.

His tomb stands, as he wished it, on the southwestern slope of Calton Hill, in the Old Calton Cemetery. Adam Smith later recounted Hume's amusing speculation that he might ask Charon, Hades' ferryman, to allow him a few more years of life in order to see "the downfall of some of the prevailing systems of superstition". The ferryman replied, "You loitering rogue, that will not happen these many hundred years… Get into the boat this instant."

== Philosophy ==
A Treatise of Human Nature begins with the introduction: "'Tis evident, that all the sciences have a relation, more or less, to human nature.... Even Mathematics, Natural Philosophy, and Natural Religion, are in some measure dependent on the science of Man." The science of man, as Hume explains, is the "only solid foundation for the other sciences" and that the method for this science requires both experience and observation as the foundations of a logical argument. In regards to this, philosophical historian Frederick Copleston (1999) suggests that it was Hume's aim to apply to the science of man the method of experimental philosophy (the term that was current at the time to imply natural philosophy), and that "Hume's plan is to extend to philosophy in general the methodological limitations of Newtonian physics."

Until recently, Hume was seen as a forerunner of logical positivism, a form of anti-metaphysical empiricism. According to the logical positivists (in summary of their verification principle), unless a statement could be verified by experience, or else was true or false by definition (i.e., either tautological or contradictory), then it was meaningless. Hume, on this view, was a proto-positivist, who, in his philosophical writings, attempted to demonstrate the ways in which ordinary propositions about objects, causal relations, the self and so on, are semantically equivalent to propositions about one's experiences.

Many commentators have since rejected this understanding of Humean empiricism, stressing an epistemological (rather than a semantic) reading of his project. (Note: For example, see Craig (1987, Ch. 2); Strawson (2014); and Wright (1983).) According to this opposing view, Hume's empiricism consisted in the idea that it is our knowledge, and not our ability to conceive, that is restricted to what can be experienced. Hume thought that we can form beliefs about that which extends beyond any possible experience, through the operation of faculties such as custom and the imagination, but he was sceptical about claims to knowledge on this basis.

=== Impressions and ideas ===
A central doctrine of Hume's philosophy, stated in the very first lines of the Treatise of Human Nature, is that the mind consists of perceptions, or the mental objects which are present to it, and which divide into two categories: "All the perceptions of the human mind resolve themselves into two distinct kinds, which I shall call impressions and ideas." Hume believed that it would "not be very necessary to employ many words in explaining this distinction", which commentators have generally taken to mean the distinction between feeling and thinking. Controversially, Hume, in some sense, may regard the distinction as a matter of degree, as he takes impressions to be distinguished from ideas on the basis of their force, liveliness and vivacity—what Henry E. Allison (2008) calls the "FLV criterion". Ideas are therefore "faint" copies of impressions. For example, experiencing the painful sensation of touching a hot pan's handle is more forceful than simply thinking about touching a hot pan. According to Hume, impressions are meant to be the original form of all our ideas. From this, Don Garrett (2002) has coined the term copy principle, referring to Hume's doctrine that all ideas are ultimately copied from some original impression, whether it be a passion or sensation, from which they derive.

==== Hume's fork: relations of ideas and matters of fact ====
A related distinction in Hume's philosophy, later known as Hume's fork, divides "All the objects of human reason or enquiry ... naturally ... into two kinds, to wit, Relations of Ideas, and Matters of Fact." Relations of ideas, such as mathematical truths, are discoverable by thought alone, and their denial implies a contradiction. Matters of fact are known through experience and their denial is conceivable, even when they are strongly supported by observation. This distinction is central to Hume's account of causation, since causal claims are not relations of ideas: an effect cannot be deduced from the mere idea of its cause.

==== Simple and complex ====
After establishing the forcefulness of impressions and ideas, these two categories are further broken down into simple and complex: "simple perceptions or impressions and ideas are such as admit of no distinction nor separation", whereas "the complex are the contrary to these, and may be distinguished into parts". When looking at an apple, a person experiences a variety of colour-sensations—what Hume notes as a complex impression. Similarly, a person experiences a variety of taste-sensations, tactile-sensations and smell-sensations when biting into an apple, with the overall sensation—again, a complex impression. Thinking about an apple allows a person to form complex ideas, which are made of similar parts as the complex impressions they were developed from, but which are also less forceful. Hume believes that complex perceptions can be broken down into smaller and smaller parts until perceptions are reached that have no parts of their own, and these perceptions are thus referred to as simple.

==== Principles of association ====
Regardless of how boundless it may seem; a person's imagination is confined to the mind's ability to recombine the information it has already acquired from the body's sensory experience (the ideas that have been derived from impressions). In addition, "as our imagination takes our most basic ideas and leads us to form new ones, it is directed by three principles of association, namely, resemblance, contiguity, and cause and effect":

- The principle of resemblance refers to the tendency of ideas to become associated if the objects they represent resemble one another. For example, someone looking at an illustration of a flower can conceive an idea of the physical flower because the idea of the illustrated object is associated with the physical object's idea.
- The principle of contiguity describes the tendency of ideas to become associated if the objects they represent are near to each other in time or space, such as when the thought of a crayon in a box leads one to think of the crayon contiguous to it.
- The principle of cause and effect refers to the tendency of ideas to become associated if the objects they represent are causally related, which explains how remembering a broken window can make someone think of a ball that had caused the window to shatter.

Hume elaborates more on the last principle, explaining that, when somebody observes that one object or event consistently produces the same object or event, that results in "an expectation that a particular event (a 'cause') will be followed by another event (an 'effect') previously and constantly associated with it". Hume calls this principle custom, or habit, saying that "custom...renders our experience useful to us, and makes us expect, for the future, a similar train of events with those which have appeared in the past". However, even though custom can serve as a guide in life, it still only represents an expectation. In other words:

Experience cannot establish a necessary connection between cause and effect, because we can imagine without contradiction a case where the cause does not produce its usual effect.... The reason why we mistakenly infer that there is something in the cause that necessarily produces its effect is because our past experiences have habituated us to think in this way.

Continuing this idea, Hume argues that "only in the pure realm of ideas, logic, and mathematics, not contingent on the direct sense awareness of reality, [can] causation safely...be applied—all other sciences are reduced to probability". He uses this scepticism to reject metaphysics and many theological views on the basis that they are not grounded in fact and observations, and are therefore beyond the reach of human understanding.

=== Induction and causation ===
The cornerstone of Hume's epistemology is the problem of induction. This may be the area of Hume's thought where his scepticism about human powers of reason is most pronounced. The problem revolves around the plausibility of inductive reasoning, that is, reasoning from the observed behaviour of objects to their behaviour when unobserved. As Hume wrote, induction concerns how things behave when they go "beyond the present testimony of the senses, or the records of our memory". Hume argues that we tend to believe that things behave in a regular manner, meaning that patterns in the behaviour of objects seem to persist into the future, and throughout the unobserved present. Hume's argument is that we cannot rationally justify the claim that nature will continue to be uniform, as justification comes in only two varieties—demonstrative reasoning and probable reasoning (Note: These are Hume's terms. In modern parlance, demonstration may be termed deductive reasoning, while probability may be termed inductive reasoning. Millican, Peter. 1996. Hume, Induction and Probability. Leeds: University of Leeds. Archived from the original on 20 October 2017. Retrieved 6 June 2014.)—and both of these are inadequate. With regard to demonstrative reasoning, Hume argues that the uniformity principle cannot be demonstrated, as it is "consistent and conceivable" that nature might stop being regular. Turning to probable reasoning, Hume argues that we cannot hold that nature will continue to be uniform because it has been in the past. As this is using the very sort of reasoning (induction) that is under question, it would be circular reasoning. Thus, no form of justification will rationally warrant our inductive inferences.

Hume's solution to this problem is to argue that, rather than reason, natural instinct explains the human practice of making inductive inferences. He asserts that "Nature, by an absolute and uncontroulable [sic] necessity has determin'd us to judge as well as to breathe and feel." In 1985, and in agreement with Hume, John D. Kenyon writes:

Reason might manage to raise a doubt about the truth of a conclusion of natural inductive inference just for a moment ... but the sheer agreeableness of animal faith will protect us from excessive caution and sterile suspension of belief.

Others, such as Charles Sanders Peirce, have demurred from Hume's solution, while some, such as Kant and Karl Popper, have thought that Hume's analysis has "posed a most fundamental challenge to all human knowledge claims".

The notion of causation is closely linked to the problem of induction. According to Hume, we reason inductively by associating events that have been constantly conjoining in experience. It is the mental act of association that is the basis of our concept of causation. At least three interpretations of Hume's theory of causation are represented in the literature:

1. the logical positivist
2. the sceptical realist
3. the quasi-realist

Hume acknowledged that there are events constantly unfolding, and humanity cannot guarantee that these events are caused by prior events or are independent instances. He opposed the widely accepted theory of causation that 'all events have a specific course or reason'. Therefore, Hume crafted his own theory of causation, formed through his empiricist and sceptic beliefs. He believed "causes and effects are discoverable not by reason, but by experience". He goes on to say that, even with the perspective of the past, humanity cannot dictate future events because thoughts of the past are limited, compared to the possibilities for the future.

Hume explains his theory of causation and causal inference by division into three different parts. In these three branches he explains his ideas and compares and contrasts his views to his predecessors. These branches are the Critical Phase, the Constructive Phase and Belief. In the Critical Phase, Hume denies his predecessors' theories of causation. Next, he uses the Constructive Phase to resolve any doubts the reader may have had while observing the Critical Phase. "Habit or Custom" mends the gaps in reasoning that occur without the human mind even realising it. Associating ideas has become second nature to the human mind. It "makes us expect for the future, a similar train of events with those which have appeared in the past". However, Hume says that this association cannot be trusted because the span of the human mind to comprehend the past is not necessarily applicable to the wide and distant future. This leads him to the third branch of causal inference, Belief. Belief is what drives the human mind to hold that expectancy of the future is based on past experience. Throughout his explanation of causal inference, Hume argues that the future is not certain to be repetition of the past and that induction relies on the assumption of uniformity, but that this assumption itself cannot be rationally justified.

The logical positivist interpretation is that Hume analyses causal propositions, such as "A causes B", in terms of regularities in perception: "A causes B" is equivalent to "Whenever A-type events happen, B-type ones follow", where "whenever" refers to all possible perceptions. In his Treatise of Human Nature, Hume wrote:

Power and necessity...are...qualities of perceptions, not of objects...felt by the soul and not perceiv'd externally in bodies.

This view is rejected by sceptical realists, who argue that Hume thought that causation amounts to more than just the regular succession of events. Hume said that, when two events are causally conjoined, a necessary connection underpins the conjunction:

Shall we rest contented with these two relations of contiguity and succession, as affording a complete idea of causation? By no means...there is a necessary connexion to be taken into consideration.

Angela Coventry writes that, for Hume, "there is nothing in any particular instance of cause and effect involving external objects which suggests the idea of power or necessary connection" and "we are ignorant of the powers that operate between objects". However, while denying the possibility of knowing the powers between objects, Hume accepted the causal principle, writing: "I never asserted so absurd a proposition as that something could arise without a cause."

Galen Strawson agrees, writing that "Hume's regularity theory of causation is only a theory about ... causation so far as we know about it in the world." As far as "causation as it is in the world ... Hume believes firmly, and with overwhelmingly good reasons ... in something like natural necessity."

It has been argued that, while Hume did not think that causation is reducible to pure regularity, he was not a full-fledged realist either. Simon Blackburn calls this a quasi-realist reading, saying that "Someone talking of cause is voicing a distinct mental set: he is by no means in the same state as someone merely describing regular sequences." In Hume's words, "nothing is more usual than to apply to external bodies every internal sensation, which they occasion".

=== 'Self' ===
Empiricist philosophers, such as Hume and George Berkeley, favoured the bundle theory of personal identity. In this theory, "the mind itself, far from being an independent power, is simply 'a bundle of perceptions' without unity or cohesive quality". The self is nothing but a bundle of experiences linked by the relations of causation and resemblance; or, more accurately, the empirically warranted idea of the self is just the idea of such a bundle. According to Hume:

For my part, when I enter most intimately into what I call myself, I always stumble on some particular perception or other, of heat or cold, light or shade, love or hatred, pain or pleasure. I never can catch myself at any time without a perception, and never can observe any thing but the perception. When my perceptions are removed for any time, as by sound sleep; so long I am insensible of myself, and may truly be said not to exist.

— A Treatise of Human Nature, Book I.iv, section 6

This view is supported by, for example, positivist interpreters, who have seen Hume as suggesting that terms such as "self", "person", or "mind" refer to collections of "sense-contents". A modern-day version of the bundle theory of the mind has been advanced by Derek Parfit in his Reasons and Persons.

However, some philosophers have criticised Hume's bundle-theory interpretation of personal identity. They argue that distinct selves can have perceptions that stand in relation to similarity and causality. Thus, perceptions must already come parcelled into distinct "bundles" before they can be associated according to the relations of similarity and causality. In other words, the mind must already possess a unity that cannot be generated, or constituted, by these relations alone. Since the bundle-theory interpretation portrays Hume as answering an ontological question, philosophers like Galen Strawson see Hume as not very concerned with such questions and have queried whether this view is really Hume's. Instead, Strawson suggests that Hume might have been answering an epistemological question about the causal origin of our concept of the self. In the Appendix to the Treatise, Hume declares himself dissatisfied with his earlier account of personal identity in Book 1. Corliss Swain notes that "Commentators agree that if Hume did find some new problem" when he reviewed the section on personal identity, "he wasn't forthcoming about its nature in the Appendix." One interpretation of Hume's view of the self, argued for by the philosopher and psychologist James Giles, is that Hume is not arguing for a bundle theory, which is a form of reductionism, but rather for an eliminative view of the self. Rather than reducing the self to a bundle of perceptions, Hume rejects the idea of the self altogether. On this interpretation, Hume is proposing a "no-self theory" and thus has much in common with Buddhist thought (see anattā). The psychologist Alison Gopnik has argued that Hume was in a position to learn about Buddhist thought during his time in France in the 1730s.

=== Practical reason ===
Practical reason relates to whether standards or principles exist that are also authoritative for all rational beings, dictating people's intentions and actions. Hume is mainly considered an anti-rationalist, denying the possibility for practical reason, although other philosophers such as Christine Korsgaard, Jean Hampton and Elijah Millgram claim that Hume is not so much of an anti-rationalist as he is just a sceptic of practical reason.

Hume denied the existence of practical reason as a principle because he claimed reason does not have any effect on morality, since morality is capable of producing effects in people that reason alone cannot create. As Hume explains in A Treatise of Human Nature (1740):

Morals excite passions, and produce or prevent actions. Reason of itself is utterly impotent in this particular. The rules of morality, therefore, are not conclusions of our reason."

Since practical reason is supposed to regulate our actions (in theory), Hume denied practical reason on the grounds that reason cannot directly oppose passions. As Hume puts it, "Reason is, and ought only to be the slave of the passions, and can never pretend to any other office than to serve and obey them." Reason is less significant than any passion because reason has no original influence, while "A passion is an original existence, or, if you will, modification of existence."

Practical reason is also concerned with the value of actions rather than the truth of propositions, so Hume believed that reason's shortcoming of affecting morality proved that practical reason could not be authoritative for all rational beings, since morality was essential for dictating people's intentions and actions.

=== Ethics ===
Hume's writings on ethics began in the 1740 Treatise and were refined in his An Enquiry Concerning the Principles of Morals (1751). He understood feeling, rather than knowing, as that which governs ethical actions, stating that "moral decisions are grounded in moral sentiment." Arguing that reason cannot be behind morality, he wrote:

Morals excite passions, and produce or prevent actions. Reason itself is utterly impotent in this particular. The rules of morality, therefore, are not conclusions of our reason.

Hume's moral sentimentalism was shared by his close friend Adam Smith, and the two were mutually influenced by the moral reflections of their older contemporary, Francis Hutcheson. Peter Singer claims that Hume's argument that morals cannot have a rational basis alone "would have been enough to earn him a place in the history of ethics."

Hume also put forward the is–ought problem, later known as Hume's Law, denying the possibility of logically deriving what ought to be from what is. According to the Treatise (1740), in every system of morality that Hume has read, the author begins by stating facts about the world as it is but always ends up suddenly referring to what ought to be the case. Hume demands that a reason should be given for inferring what ought to be the case, from what is the case. This is because it "seems altogether inconceivable, how this new relation can be a deduction from others."

Hume's theory of ethics has been influential in modern-day meta-ethical theory, helping to inspire emotivism, and ethical expressivism and non-cognitivism, as well as Allan Gibbard's general theory of moral judgement and judgements of rationality.

=== Aesthetics ===
Hume's ideas about aesthetics and the theory of art are spread throughout his works, but are particularly connected with his ethical writings, and also the essays "Of the Standard of Taste" and "Of Tragedy" (1757). His views are rooted in the work of Joseph Addison and Francis Hutcheson. In the Treatise (1740), he touches on the connection between beauty and deformity and vice and virtue. His later writings on the subject continue to draw parallels of beauty and deformity in art with conduct and character.

In "Standard of Taste", Hume argues that no rules can be drawn up about what is a tasteful object. However, a reliable critic of taste can be recognised as objective, sensible and unprejudiced, and as having extensive experience. "Of Tragedy" addresses the question of why humans enjoy tragic drama. Hume was concerned with the way spectators find pleasure in the sorrow and anxiety depicted in a tragedy. He argued that this was because the spectator is aware that he is witnessing a dramatic performance. There is pleasure in realising that the terrible events that are being shown are actually fiction. Furthermore, Hume laid down rules for educating people in taste and correct conduct, and his writings in this area have been very influential on English and Anglo-Saxon aesthetics.

=== Free will, determinism and responsibility ===
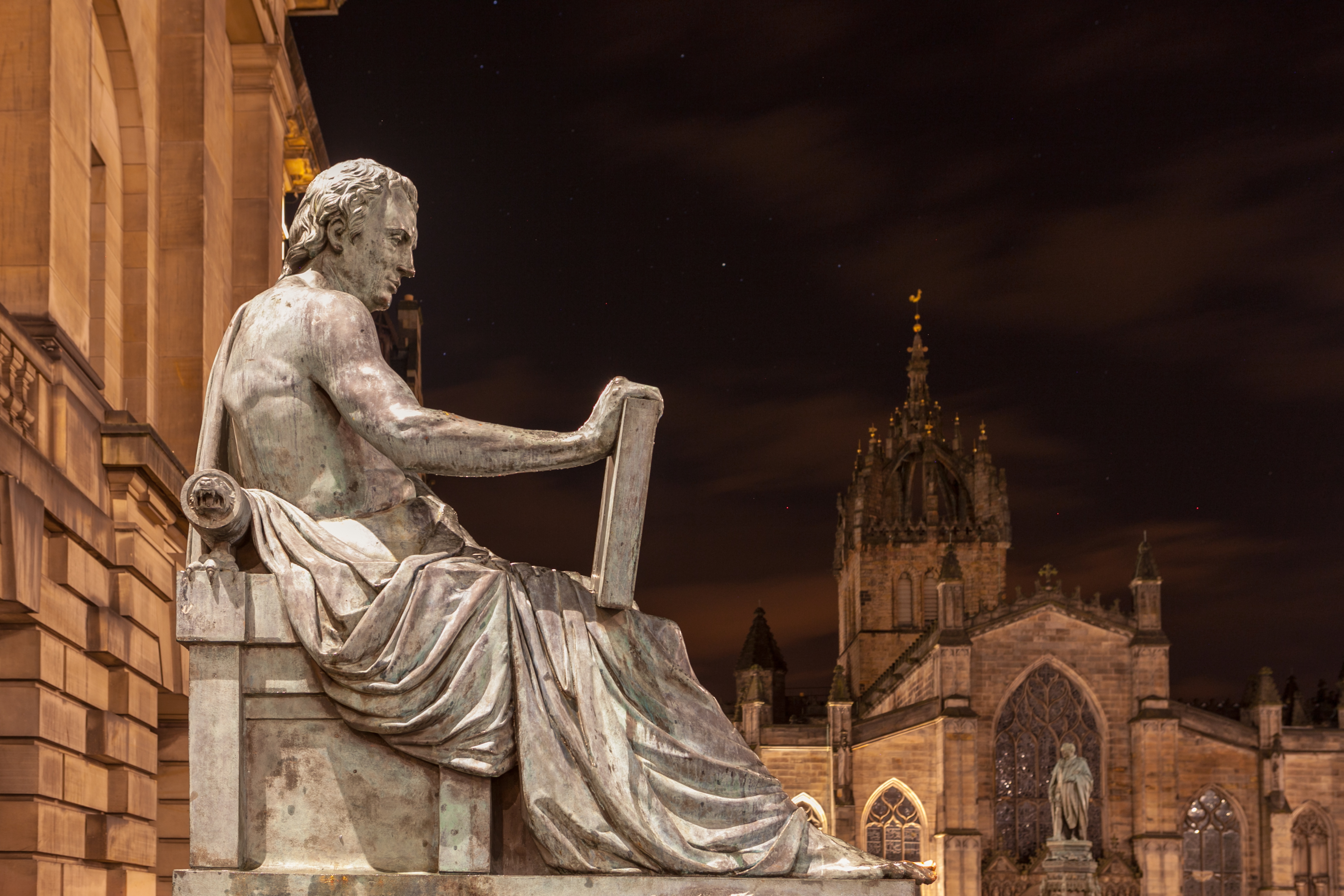
Statue of Hume, sculpted by Alexander Stoddart, on the Royal Mile in Edinburgh

Hume, along with Thomas Hobbes, is cited as a classical compatibilist about the notions of freedom and determinism. Compatibilism seeks to reconcile human freedom with the mechanist view that human beings are part of a deterministic universe, which is completely governed by physical laws. On this point, Hume was influenced greatly by the scientific revolution, particularly by Isaac Newton. Hume argued that the dispute between freedom and determinism continued over 2000 years due to ambiguous terminology. He wrote: "From this circumstance alone, that a controversy has been long kept on foot...we may presume that there is some ambiguity in the expression", and that different disputants use different meanings for the same terms.

Hume defines the concept of necessity as "the uniformity, observable in the operations of nature; where similar objects are constantly conjoined together", and liberty as "a power of acting or not acting, according to the determinations of the will". He then argues that, according to these definitions, not only are the two compatible, but liberty requires necessity. For if our actions were not necessitated in the above sense, they would "have so little in connexion with motives, inclinations and circumstances, that one does not follow with a certain degree of uniformity from the other". But, if our actions are not thus connected to the will, then our actions can never be free: they would be matters of "chance; which is universally allowed to have no existence". The philosopher John Passmore writes that confusion has arisen because "necessity" has been taken to mean "necessary connexion". Once this has been abandoned, Hume argues, "liberty and necessity will be found not to be in conflict one with another".

Moreover, Hume goes on to argue that, in order to be held morally responsible, it is required that our behaviour be caused or necessitated, for:

Actions are, by their very nature, temporary and perishing; and where they proceed not from some cause in the character and disposition of the person who performed them, they can neither redound to his honour, if good; nor infamy, if evil.

Hume describes the link between causality and our capacity to rationally make a decision from this an inference of the mind. Human beings assess a situation based upon certain predetermined events and from that form a choice. Hume believes that this choice is made spontaneously. Hume calls this form of decision making the liberty of spontaneity.

Education writer Richard Wright considers that Hume's position rejects a famous moral puzzle attributed to French philosopher Jean Buridan. The Buridan's ass puzzle describes a donkey that is hungry. This donkey has separate bales of hay on both sides, which are of equal distances from him. The problem concerns which bale the donkey chooses. Buridan was said to believe that the donkey would die, because he has no autonomy. The donkey is incapable of forming a rational decision as there is no motive to choose one bale of hay over the other. However, human beings are different, because a human who is placed in a position where he is forced to choose one loaf of bread over another will make a decision to take one in lieu of the other. For Buridan, humans have the capacity of autonomy, and he recognises the choice that is ultimately made will be based on chance, as both loaves of bread are exactly the same. However, Wright says that Hume completely rejects this notion, arguing that a human will spontaneously act in such a situation because he is faced with impending death if he fails to do so. Such a decision is not made on the basis of chance, but rather on necessity and spontaneity, given the prior predetermined events leading up to the predicament.

Hume's argument is supported by modern-day compatibilists such as R. E. Hobart, a pseudonym of the philosopher Dickinson S. Miller. However, P. F. Strawson argued that the issue of whether we hold one another morally responsible does not ultimately depend on the truth or falsity of a metaphysical thesis such as determinism. This is because our so holding one another is a non-rational human sentiment that is not predicated on such theses.

=== Religion ===
The philosopher Paul Russell contends that Hume wrote "on almost every central question in the philosophy of religion", and that these writings "are among the most important and influential contributions on this topic." Touching on the philosophy, psychology, history and anthropology of religious thought, Hume's 1757 dissertation "The Natural History of Religion" argues that the monotheistic religions of Judaism, Christianity and Islam all derive from earlier polytheistic religions. He went on to suggest that all religious belief "traces, in the end, to dread of the unknown". Hume had also written on religious subjects in the first Enquiry, as well as later in the Dialogues Concerning Natural Religion.

==== Religious views ====
Although he wrote a great deal about religion, Hume's personal views have been the subject of much debate. (Note: For example, see Russell (2008); O'Connor (2013); and Norton (1993).) Some modern critics have described Hume's religious views as agnostic or have described him as a "Pyrrhonian skeptic". Contemporaries considered him to be an atheist, or at least un-Christian, enough so that the Church of Scotland seriously considered bringing charges of infidelity against him. Evidence of his un-Christian beliefs can especially be found in his writings on miracles, in which he attempts to separate historical method from the narrative accounts of miracles. Nevertheless, modern scholars have tended to dismiss the claims of Hume's contemporaries describing him as an atheist as coming from religiously intolerant people who did not understand Hume's philosophy. The fact that contemporaries suspected him of atheism is exemplified by a story Hume liked to tell:

The best theologian he ever met, he used to say, was the old Edinburgh fishwife who, having recognized him as Hume the atheist, refused to pull him out of the bog into which he had fallen until he declared he was a Christian and repeated the Lord's prayer.

However, in works such as "Of Superstition and Enthusiasm", Hume specifically seems to support the standard religious views of his time and place. This still meant that he could be very critical of the Catholic Church, dismissing it with the standard Protestant accusations of superstition and idolatry, as well as dismissing as idolatry what his compatriots saw as uncivilised beliefs. He also considered extreme Protestant sects, the members of which he called "enthusiasts", to be corrupters of religion. By contrast, in "The Natural History of Religion", Hume presents arguments suggesting that polytheism had much to commend it over monotheism. Additionally, when mentioning religion as a factor in his History of England, Hume uses it to show the deleterious effect "superstition and fanaticism" has on human progress. In his Treatise of Human Nature, Hume wrote: "Generally speaking, the errors in religions are dangerous; those in philosophy only ridiculous."

Lou Reich (1998) argues that Hume was a religious naturalist and rejects interpretations of Hume as an atheist. Paul Russell (2008) writes that Hume was plainly sceptical about religious belief, although perhaps not to the extent of complete atheism. He suggests that Hume's position is best characterised by the term "irreligion", while philosopher David O'Connor (2013) argues that Hume's final position was "weakly deistic". For O'Connor, Hume's "position is deeply ironic. This is because, while inclining towards a weak form of deism, he seriously doubts that we can ever find a sufficiently favourable balance of evidence to justify accepting any religious position." He adds that Hume "did not believe in the God of standard theism ... but he did not rule out all concepts of deity", and that "ambiguity suited his purposes, and this creates difficulty in definitively pinning down his final position on religion".

==== Design argument ====
One of the traditional topics of natural theology is that of the existence of God, and one of the a posteriori arguments for this is the argument from design or the teleological argument. The argument is that the existence of God can be proved by the design that is obvious in the complexity of the world, which Encyclopædia Britannica states is "the most popular", because it is:

...the most accessible of the theistic arguments ... which identifies evidences of design in nature, inferring from them a divine designer ... The fact that the universe as a whole is a coherent and efficiently functioning system likewise, in this view, indicates a divine intelligence behind it.

In An Enquiry Concerning Human Understanding, Hume wrote that the design argument seems to depend upon our experience, and its proponents "always suppose the universe, an effect quite singular and unparalleled, to be the proof of a Deity, a cause no less singular and unparalleled". The philosopher Louise E. Loeb (2010) notes that Hume is saying that only experience and observation can be our guide to making inferences about the conjunction between events. However, according to Hume:

We observe neither God nor other universes, and hence no conjunction involving them. There is no observed conjunction to ground an inference either to extended objects or to God, as unobserved causes.

Hume also criticised the argument in his Dialogues Concerning Natural Religion (1779). Hume proposes a finite universe with a finite number of particles. Given infinite time, these particles could randomly fall into any arrangement, including our seemingly designed world.

A century later, the idea of order without design was rendered more plausible by Charles Darwin's discovery that the adaptations of the forms of life result from the natural selection of inherited characteristics. For philosopher James D. Madden, it is "Hume, rivaled only by Darwin, [who] has done the most to undermine in principle our confidence in arguments from design among all figures in the Western intellectual tradition".

Finally, Hume discussed a version of the anthropic principle, which is the idea that theories of the universe are constrained by the need to allow for man's existence in it as an observer. Hume has his sceptical mouthpiece Philo suggest that there may have been many worlds, produced by an incompetent designer, whom he called a "stupid mechanic". In his Dialogues Concerning Natural Religion, Hume wrote:

Many worlds might have been botched and bungled throughout an eternity, ere this system was struck out: much labour lost: many fruitless trials made: and a slow, but continued improvement carried on during infinite ages in the art of world-making.

The philosopher Daniel Dennett suggested that this mechanical explanation of teleology, although "obviously ... an amusing philosophical fantasy", anticipated the notion of natural selection, the 'continued improvement' being like "any Darwinian selection algorithm".

==== Argument against miracles ====
In his discussion of miracles, Hume argues that we should not believe miracles have occurred and that they do not therefore provide us with any reason to think God exists. In An Enquiry Concerning Human Understanding (Section 10), Hume defines a miracle as "a transgression of a law of nature by a particular volition of the Deity, or by the interposition of some invisible agent". Hume says we believe an event that has frequently occurred is likely to occur again, but we also take into account those instances where the event did not occur:

A wise man ... considers which side is supported by the greater number of experiments. ... A hundred instances or experiments on one side, and fifty on another, afford a doubtful expectation of any event; though a hundred uniform experiments, with only one that is contradictory, reasonably beget a pretty strong degree of assurance. In all cases, we must balance the opposite experiments ... and deduct the smaller number from the greater, in order to know the exact force of the superior evidence.

Hume discusses the testimony of those who report miracles. He wrote that testimony might be doubted even from some great authority in case the facts themselves are not credible: "[T]he evidence, resulting from the testimony, admits of a diminution, greater or less, in proportion as the fact is more or less unusual."

Although Hume leaves open the possibility for miracles to occur and be reported, he offers various arguments against this ever having happened in history. He points out that people often lie, and they have good reasons to lie about miracles occurring either because they believe they are doing so for the benefit of their religion or because of the fame that results. Furthermore, people by nature enjoy relating miracles they have heard without caring for their veracity and thus miracles are easily transmitted even when false. Also, Hume notes that miracles seem to occur mostly in "ignorant and barbarous nations" and times, and the reason they do not occur in the civilised societies is such societies are not awed by what they know to be natural events. Hume recognises that over a long period of time, various coincidences can provide the appearance of intention. Finally, the miracles of each religion argue against all other religions and their miracles, and so even if a proportion of all reported miracles across the world fit Hume's requirement for belief, the miracles of each religion make the other less likely.

Hume was extremely pleased with his argument against miracles in his Enquiry. He states, "I flatter myself, that I have discovered an argument of a like nature, which, if just, will, with the wise and learned, be an everlasting check to all kinds of superstitious delusion, and consequently, will be useful as long as the world endures." Thus, Hume's argument against miracles had a more abstract basis founded upon the scrutiny, not just primarily of miracles, but of all forms of belief systems. It is a commonsense notion of veracity based upon epistemological evidence, and founded on a principle of rationality, proportionality and reasonability.

The criterion for assessing Hume's belief system is based on the balance of probability whether something is more likely than not to have occurred. Since the weight of empirical experience contradicts the notion for the existence of miracles, such accounts should be treated with scepticism. Further, the myriad of accounts of miracles contradict one another, as some people who receive miracles will aim to prove the authority of Jesus, whereas others will aim to prove the authority of Muhammad or some other religious prophet or deity. These various differing accounts weaken the overall evidential power of miracles.

Despite all this, Hume observes that belief in miracles is popular, and that "the gazing populace... receive greedily, without examination, whatever soothes superstition, and promotes wonder."

Critics have argued that Hume's position assumes the character of miracles and natural laws prior to any specific examination of miracle claims, thus it amounts to a subtle form of begging the question. To assume that testimony is a homogeneous reference group seems unwise – to compare private miracles with public miracles, unintellectual observers with intellectual observers and those who have little to gain and much to lose with those with much to gain and little to lose is not convincing to many. Indeed, many have argued that miracles not only do not contradict the laws of nature but require the laws of nature to be intelligible as miraculous, and thus subverting the law of nature. For example, William Adams remarks that "there must be an ordinary course of nature before anything can be extraordinary. There must be a stream before anything can be interrupted." They have also noted that it requires an appeal to inductive inference, as none have observed every part of nature nor examined every possible miracle claim, for instance those in the future. This, in Hume's philosophy, was especially problematic.

Little appreciated is the voluminous literature either foreshadowing Hume, in the likes of Thomas Sherlock or directly responding to and engaging with Hume—from William Paley, William Adams, John Douglas, John Leland and George Campbell, among others. Regarding the latter, it is rumoured that, having read Campbell's Dissertation, Hume remarked that "the Scotch theologue had beaten him."

Hume's main argument concerning miracles is that miracles by definition are singular events that differ from the established laws of nature. Such natural laws are codified as a result of past experiences. Therefore, a miracle is a violation of all prior experience and thus incapable on this basis of reasonable belief. However, the probability that something has occurred in contradiction of all past experience should always be judged to be less than the probability that either one's senses have deceived one, or the person recounting the miraculous occurrence is lying or mistaken, Hume would say, all of which he had past experience of. For Hume, this refusal to grant credence does not guarantee correctness. He offers the example of an Indian Prince, who, having grown up in a hot country, refuses to believe that water has frozen. By Hume's lights, this refusal is not wrong and the prince "reasoned justly;" it is presumably only when he has had extensive experience of the freezing of water that he has warrant to believe that the event could occur.

So, for Hume, either the miraculous event will become a recurrent event or else it will never be rational to believe it occurred. The connection to religious belief is left unexplained throughout, except for the close of his discussion where Hume notes the reliance of Christianity upon testimony of miraculous occurrences. He makes an ironic remark that anyone who "is moved by faith to assent" to revealed testimony "is conscious of a continued miracle in his own person, which subverts all principles of his understanding, and gives him a determination to believe what is most contrary to custom and experience." Hume writes that "All the testimony whichever was really given for any miracle, or ever will be given, is a subject of derision."

=== As a historian of England ===
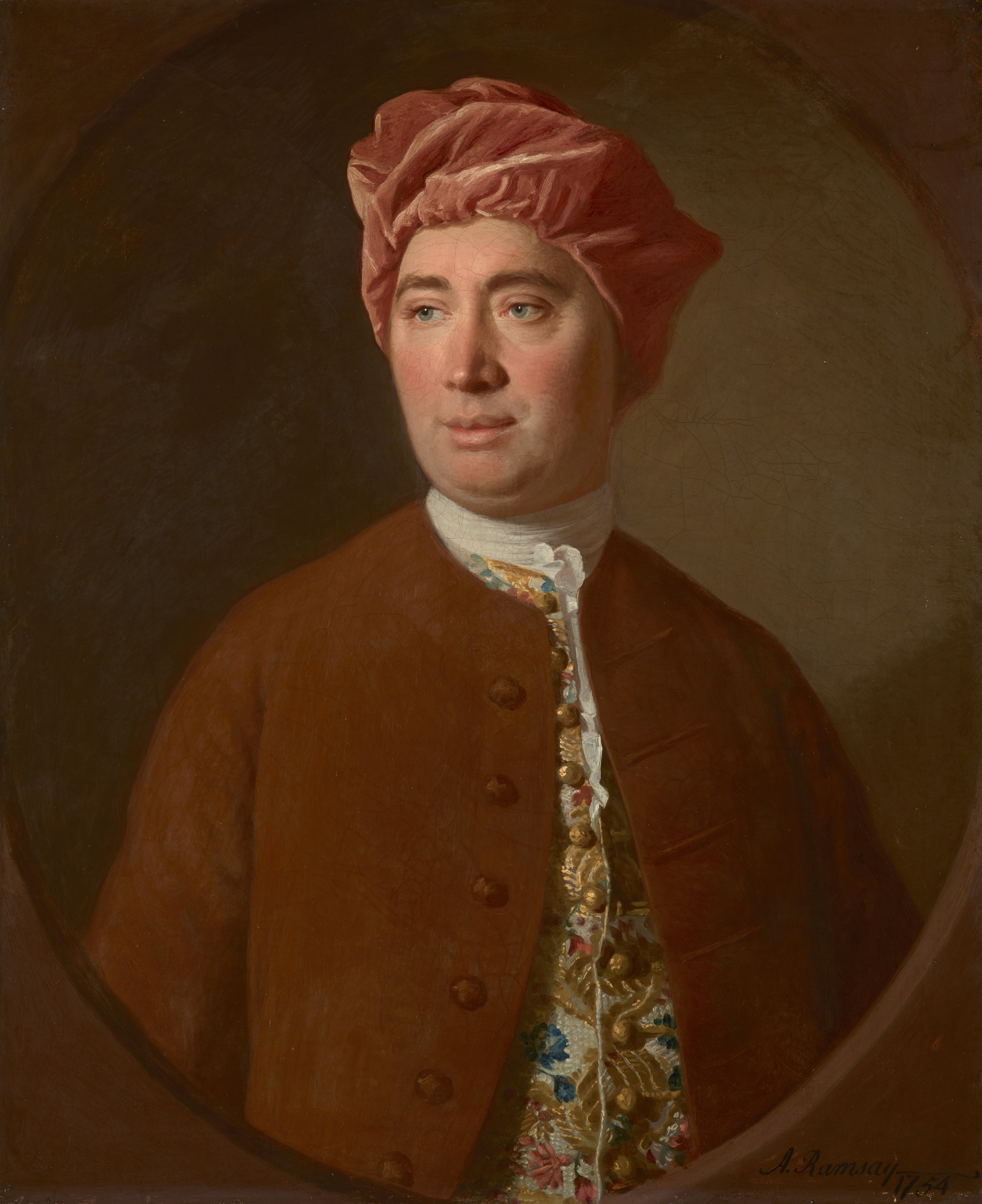
David Hume by Allan Ramsay, 1754; "Where men are the most sure and arrogant, they are commonly the most mistaken, and have there given reins to passion, without that proper deliberation and suspense, which can alone secure them from the grossest absurdities." —An Enquiry Concerning the Principles of Morals, § 9.13 : Conclusion, Pt. 1 (1751)

From 1754 to 1762 Hume published The History of England, a six-volume work which extended (according to its subtitle) "from the Invasion of Julius Caesar to the Revolution in 1688". Inspired by Voltaire's sense of the breadth of history, Hume widened the focus of the field away from merely kings, parliaments and armies, to literature and science as well. He argued that the quest for liberty was the highest standard for judging the past, and concluded that after considerable fluctuation, England at the time of his writing had achieved "the most entire system of liberty that was ever known amongst mankind". It "must be regarded as an event of cultural importance. In its own day, moreover, it was an innovation, soaring high above its very few predecessors." Hume's History of England made him famous as a historian before he was ever considered a serious philosopher. In this work, Hume uses history to tell the story of the rise of England and what led to its greatness and the disastrous effects that religious fanaticism had on its progress. For Hume, the history of England's rise may give a template for others who would also like to rise to its current greatness.

Hume's The History of England was profoundly impacted by his Scottish background. The science of sociology, which is rooted in Scottish thinking of the eighteenth century, had never before been applied to British philosophical history. Because of his Scottish background, Hume was able to bring an outsider's lens to English history that the insulated English Whigs lacked.

Hume's coverage of the political upheavals of the 17th century relied in large part on the Earl of Clarendon's History of the Rebellion and Civil Wars in England (1646–69). Generally, Hume took a moderate royalist position and considered revolution unnecessary to achieve necessary reform. Hume was considered a Tory historian and emphasised religious differences more than constitutional issues. Laird Okie explains that "Hume preached the virtues of political moderation, but ... it was moderation with an anti-Whig, pro-royalist coloring." For "Hume shared the ... Tory belief that the Stuarts were no more high-handed than their Tudor predecessors". "Even though Hume wrote with an anti-Whig animus, it is, paradoxically, correct to regard the History as an establishment work, one which implicitly endorsed the ruling oligarchy". Historians have debated whether Hume posited a universal unchanging human nature, or allowed for evolution and development.

The debate between Tory and the Whig historians can be seen in the initial reception to Hume's History of England. The Whig-dominated world of 1754 overwhelmingly disapproved of Hume's take on English history. In later editions of the book, Hume worked to "soften or expunge many villainous Whig strokes which had crept into it."

Hume did not consider himself a pure Tory. Before 1745, he was more akin to an "independent whig." In 1748, he described himself as "a whig, though a very skeptical one". This description of himself as in between Whiggism and Toryism, helps one understand that his History of England should be read as his attempt to work out his own philosophy of history.

Robert Roth argues that Hume's histories display his biases against Presbyterians and Puritans. Roth says his anti-Whig pro-monarchy position diminished the influence of his work, and that his emphasis on politics and religion led to a neglect of social and economic history.

Hume was an early cultural historian of science. His short biographies of leading scientists explored the process of scientific change. He developed new ways of seeing scientists in the context of their times by looking at how they interacted with society and each other. He covers over forty scientists, with special attention paid to Francis Bacon, Robert Boyle and Sir Isaac Newton. Hume particularly praised William Harvey, writing about his treatise of the circulation of the blood: "Harvey is entitled to the glory of having made, by reasoning alone, without any mixture of accident, a capital discovery in one of the most important branches of science."

The History became a best-seller and made Hume wealthy. It was influential for nearly a century, despite competition from imitations by Tobias Smollett (1757), Oliver Goldsmith (1771) and others. By 1894 there were at least 50 editions as well as abridgements for students, and illustrated pocket editions, probably produced specifically for women.

=== Political theory ===
Many of Hume's political ideas, such as limited government, private property when there is scarcity, and constitutionalism, are first principles of liberalism. Thomas Jefferson banned the History from the University of Virginia, feeling that it had "spread universal toryism over the land". By comparison, Samuel Johnson thought Hume to be "a Tory by chance [...] for he has no principle. If he is anything, he is a Hobbist." A major concern of Hume's political philosophy is the importance of the rule of law. He also stresses throughout his political essays the importance of moderation in politics, public spirit and regard to the community.

Throughout the period of the American Revolution, Hume had varying views. For instance, in 1768 he encouraged total revolt on the part of the Americans. In 1775 he became certain that a revolution would take place and said that he believed in the American principle and wished the British government would let them be. Hume's influence on some of the American Founding Fathers can be seen in Benjamin Franklin's suggestion at the Philadelphia Convention of 1787 that no high office in any branch of government should receive a salary, which is a suggestion Hume had made in his emendation of James Harrington's The Commonwealth of Oceana.

The legacy of religious civil war in 18th-century Scotland, combined with the relatively recent memory of the 1715 and 1745 Jacobite risings, had fostered in Hume a distaste for enthusiasm and factionalism. These appeared to him to threaten the fragile and nascent political and social stability of a country that was deeply politically and religiously divided. Hume thought that society is best governed by a general and impartial system of laws; he is less concerned about the form of government that administers these laws, so long as it does so fairly. However, he also clarified that a republic must produce laws, while "monarchy, when absolute, contains even something repugnant to law".

Hume expressed suspicion of attempts to reform society in ways that departed from long-established custom, and he counselled peoples not to resist their governments except in cases of the most egregious tyranny. However, he resisted aligning himself with either of Britain's two political parties, the Whigs and the Tories, explaining that "my views of things are more conformable to Whig principles; my representations of persons to Tory prejudices".

Jerry Z. Muller argues that Hume's political thoughts have characteristics that later became typical for American and British conservatism, which contain more positive views of capitalism than conservatism does elsewhere. Neil McArthur writes that Hume believed that we should try to balance our demands for liberty with the need for strong authority, without sacrificing either. He characterises Hume as a "precautionary conservative", whose actions would have been "determined by prudential concerns about the consequences of change, which often demand we ignore our own principles about what is ideal or even legitimate". Hume supported the liberty of the press, and was sympathetic to democracy, when suitably constrained. Douglass Adair has argued that Hume was a major inspiration for James Madison's writings, and the essay "Federalist No. 10" in particular.

Hume offered his view on the best type of society in an essay titled "Idea of a Perfect Commonwealth", which lays out what he thought was the best form of government. He hoped that "in some future age, an opportunity might be afforded of reducing the theory to practice, either by a dissolution of some old government, or by the combination of men to form a new one, in some distant part of the world". He defended a strict separation of powers, decentralisation, extending the franchise to anyone who held property of value and limiting the power of the clergy. The system of the Swiss militia was proposed as the best form of protection. Elections were to take place on an annual basis and representatives were to be unpaid. The political philosophers Leo Strauss and Joseph Cropsey, writing of Hume's thoughts about "the wise statesman", say that he "will bear a reverence to what carries the marks of age". Also, if he wishes to improve a constitution, his innovations will take account of the "ancient fabric", in order not to disturb society.

In the political analysis of the philosopher George Holland Sabine, the scepticism of Hume extended to the doctrine of government by consent. He notes that "allegiance is a habit enforced by education and consequently as much a part of human nature as any other motive."

In the 1770s Hume was critical of British policies towards the American colonies and advocated for American independence. He wrote in 1771 that "our union with America...in the nature of things, cannot long subsist."

=== Contributions to economic thought ===
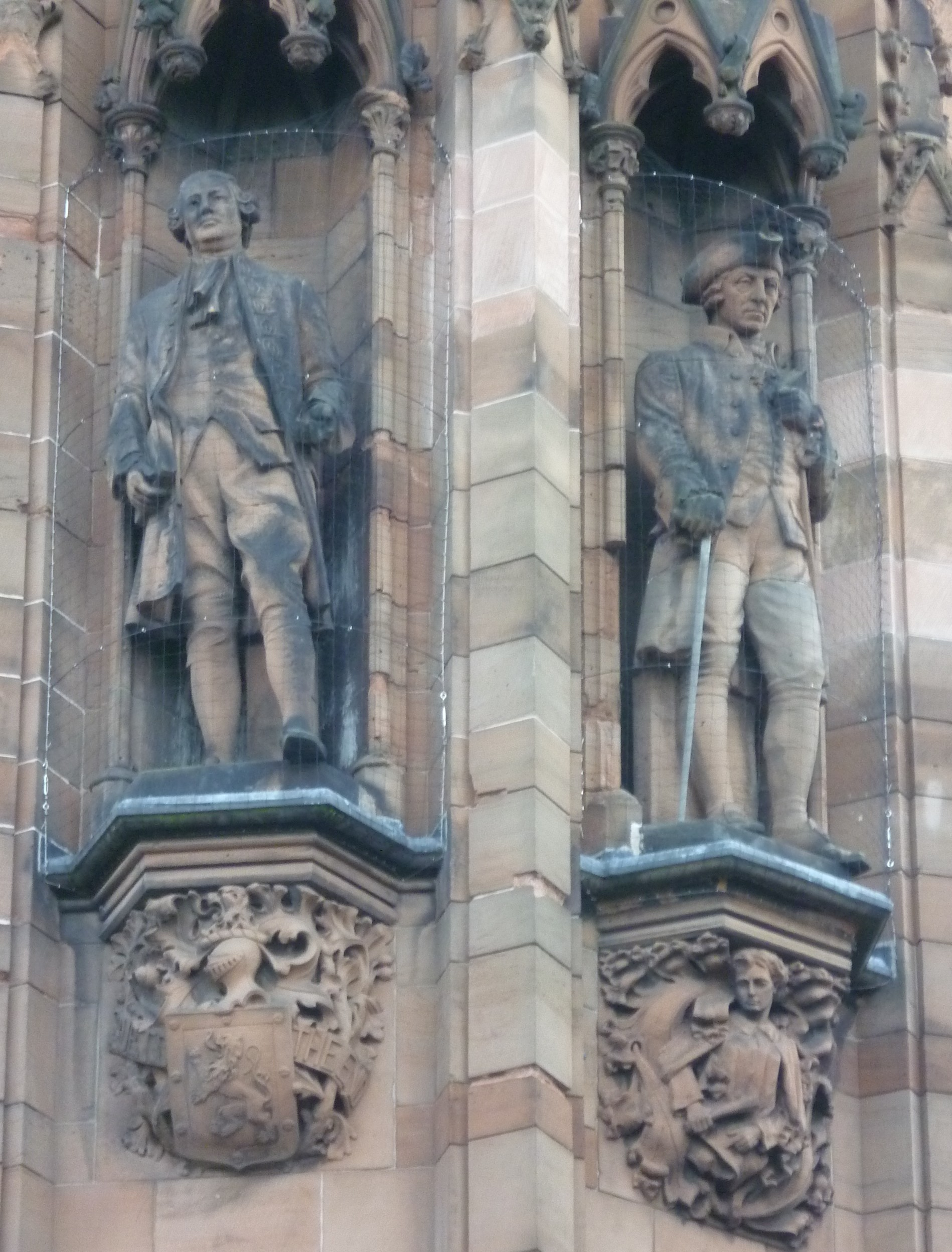
Statues of David Hume and Adam Smith by David Watson Stevenson on the Scottish National Portrait Gallery in Edinburgh

Hume expressed his economic views in his Political Discourses, which were incorporated in Essays and Treatises as Part II of Essays, Moral and Political. To what extent he was influenced by Adam Smith is difficult to assess; however, both of them had similar principles supported from historical events. At the same time, Hume did not demonstrate the concrete system of economic theory which could be observed in Smith's Wealth of Nations. However, he introduced several new ideas around which the "classical economics" of the 18th century was built. Through his discussions on politics, Hume developed many ideas that are prevalent in the field of economics. This includes ideas on private property, inflation and foreign trade. Referring to his essay "Of the Balance of Trade", the economist Paul Krugman (2012) has remarked that "David Hume created what I consider the first true economic model."

In contrast to Locke, Hume believes that private property is not a natural right. Hume argues it is justified, because resources are limited. Private property would be an unjustified, "idle ceremonial," if all goods were unlimited and available freely. Hume also believed in an unequal distribution of property, because perfect equality would destroy the ideas of thrift and industry. Perfect equality would thus lead to impoverishment.

David Hume anticipated modern monetarism. First, Hume contributed to the theory of quantity and of interest rate. Hume has been credited with being the first to prove that, on an abstract level, there is no quantifiable amount of nominal money that a country needs to thrive. Second, Hume has a theory of causation which fits in with the Chicago-school "black box" approach. According to Hume, cause and effect are related only through correlation. Hume shared the belief with modern monetarists that changes in the supply of money can affect consumption and investment. Lastly, Hume was a vocal advocate of a stable private sector, though also having some non-monetarist aspects to his economic philosophy. Having a stated preference for rising prices, for instance, Hume considered government debt to be a sort of substitute for actual money, referring to such debt as "a kind of paper credit." He also believed in heavy taxation, believing that it increases effort.

== Legacy ==
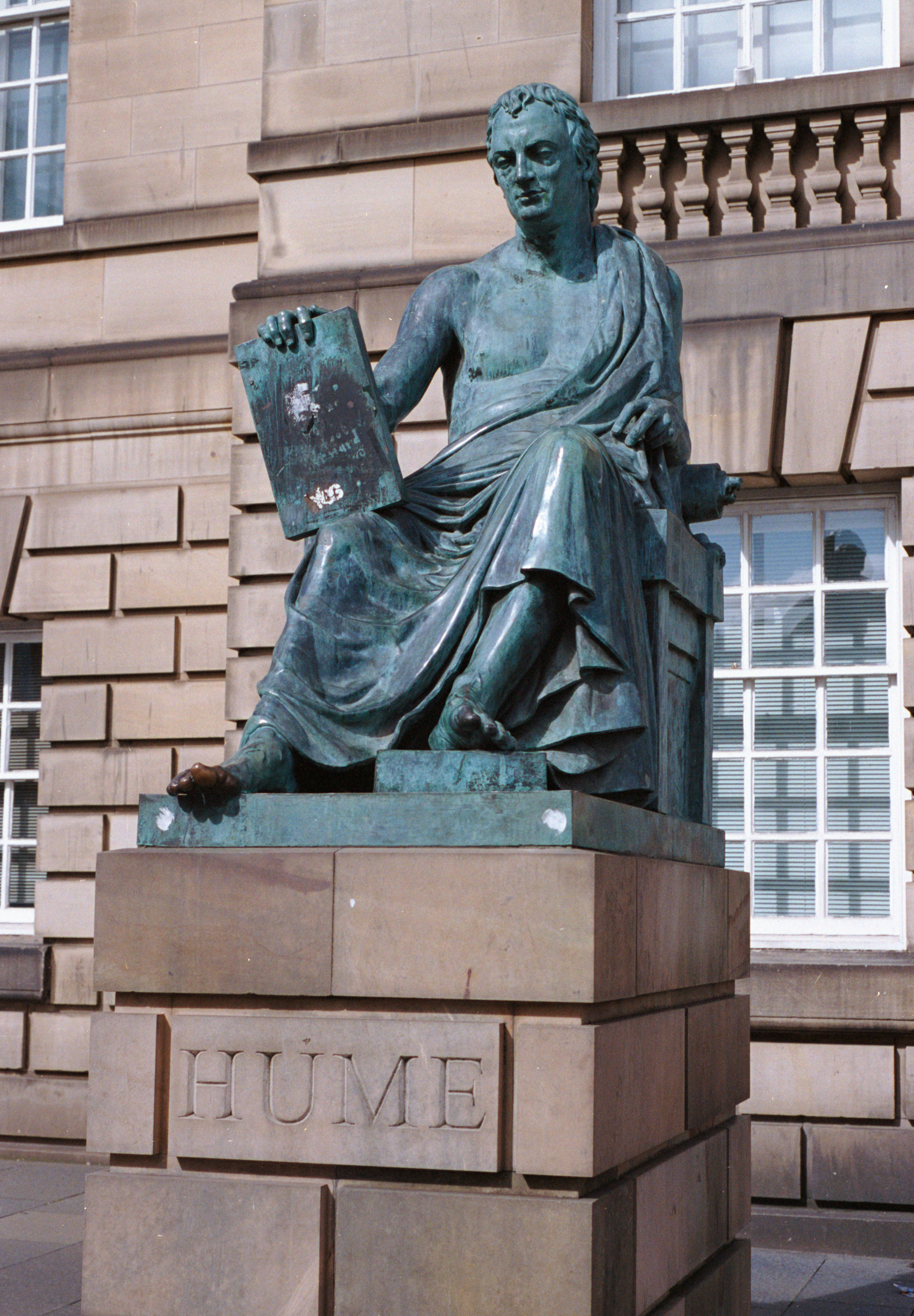
Hume's statue on Edinburgh's Royal Mile, sculpted by Alexander Stoddart

Due to Hume's vast influence on contemporary philosophy, a large number of approaches in contemporary philosophy and cognitive science are today called "Humean".

The writings of Thomas Reid, a Scottish philosopher and contemporary of Hume, were often critical of Hume's scepticism. Reid formulated his common sense philosophy, in part, as a reaction against Hume's views.

Hume influenced, and was influenced by, the Christian philosopher Joseph Butler. Hume was impressed by Butler's way of thinking about religion, and Butler may well have been influenced by Hume's writings.

Attention to Hume's philosophical works grew after the German philosopher Immanuel Kant, in his Prolegomena to Any Future Metaphysics (1783), credited Hume with awakening him from his "dogmatic slumber".

According to Arthur Schopenhauer, "there is more to be learned from each page of David Hume than from the collected philosophical works of Hegel, Herbart and Schleiermacher taken together".

A. J. Ayer, while introducing his classic exposition of logical positivism in 1936, claimed that his views were "the logical outcome of the empiricism of Berkeley and David Hume".

Albert Einstein, in 1915, wrote that he was inspired by Hume's positivism when formulating the theory of special relativity.

Hume's problem of induction was also of fundamental importance to the philosophy of Karl Popper. In his autobiography, Unended Quest, he wrote: "Knowledge ... is objective; and it is hypothetical or conjectural. This way of looking at the problem made it possible for me to reformulate Hume's problem of induction." This insight resulted in Popper's major work The Logic of Scientific Discovery. In his Conjectures and Refutations, he wrote that he "approached the problem of induction through Hume", since Hume was "perfectly right in pointing out that induction cannot be logically justified".

Hume's rationalism in religious subjects influenced, via the German-Scottish theologian Johann Joachim Spalding, the German neology school and rational theology, and contributed to the transformation of German theology in the Age of Enlightenment. Hume pioneered a comparative history of religion, tried to explain various rites and traditions as being based on deception and challenged various aspects of rational and natural theology, such as the argument from design.

The Danish theologian and philosopher Søren Kierkegaard adopted "Hume's suggestion that the role of reason is not to make us wise but to reveal our ignorance", though taking it as a reason for the necessity of religious faith, or fideism. The "fact that Christianity is contrary to reason...is the necessary precondition for true faith". The political theorist Isaiah Berlin, who has also pointed out the similarities between the arguments of Hume and Kierkegaard against rational theology, has written about Hume's influence on what Berlin calls the counter-Enlightenment and on German anti-rationalism. Berlin has also once said of Hume that "no man has influenced the history of philosophy to a deeper or more disturbing degree".

In 2003 the philosopher Jerry Fodor described Hume's Treatise as "the founding document of cognitive science".

Hume engaged with contemporary intellectuals including Jean-Jacques Rousseau, James Boswell and Adam Smith (who acknowledged Hume's influence on his economics and political philosophy). Morris and Brown write that Hume is "generally regarded as one of the most important philosophers to write in English".

In September 2020 the David Hume Tower, a University of Edinburgh building, was renamed to 40 George Square. This was following a campaign led by students of the university to rename it, in objection to Hume's writings related to race.

== Works ==
- 1734. A Kind of History of My Life. – MSS 23159 National Library of Scotland.
  - A letter to an unnamed physician, asking for advice about "the Disease of the Learned" that then afflicted him. Here he reports that at the age of eighteen "there seem'd to be open'd up to me a new Scene of Thought" that made him "throw up every other Pleasure or Business" and turned him to scholarship.
- 1739–1740. A Treatise of Human Nature: Being an Attempt to Introduce the Experimental Method of Reasoning into Moral Subjects.
  - Hume intended to see whether the Treatise of Human Nature met with success, and if so, to complete it with books devoted to Politics and Criticism. However, as Hume explained, "It fell dead-born from the press, without reaching such distinction as even to excite a murmur among the zealots" and so his further project was not completed.
- 1740. An Abstract of a Book lately Published: Entitled A Treatise of Human Nature etc.
  - Anonymously published, but almost certainly written by Hume (Note: For this, see: Keynes, J.M. and P. Sraffa. 1965. "Introduction." In An Abstract of A Treatise of Human Nature, by D. Hume (1740). Connecticut: Archon Books) in an attempt to popularise his Treatise. This work is of considerable philosophical interest as it spells out what Hume considered "The Chief Argument" of the Treatise, in a way that seems to anticipate the structure of the Enquiry Concerning Human Understanding.
- 1741. Essays, Moral, Political, and Literary (2nd ed.)
  - A collection of pieces written and published over many years, though most were collected together in 1753–54. Many of the essays are on politics and economics; other topics include aesthetic judgement, love, marriage and polygamy, and the demographics of ancient Greece and Rome. The Essays show some influence from Joseph Addison's Tatler and The Spectator, which Hume read avidly in his youth.
- 1745. A Letter from a Gentleman to His Friend in Edinburgh: Containing Some Observations on a Specimen of the Principles Concerning Religion and Morality, said to be maintain'd in a Book lately publish'd, intituled A Treatise of Human Nature etc.
  - Contains a letter written by Hume to defend himself against charges of atheism and scepticism, while applying for a chair at Edinburgh University.
- 1742. "Of Essay Writing."
- 1748. An Enquiry Concerning Human Understanding.
  - Contains reworking of the main points of the Treatise, Book 1, with the addition of material on free will (adapted from Book 2), miracles, the Design Argument and mitigated scepticism. Of Miracles, section X of the Enquiry, was often published separately.
- 1751. An Enquiry Concerning the Principles of Morals.
  - A reworking of material on morality from Book 3 of the Treatise, but with a significantly different emphasis. It "was thought by Hume to be the best of his writings."
- 1752. Political Discourses (part II of Essays, Moral, Political, and Literary within the larger Essays and Treatises on Several Subjects, vol. 1).
  - Included in Essays and Treatises on Several Subjects (1753–56) reprinted 1758–77.
- 1752–1758. Political Discourses/Discours politiques
- 1757. Four Dissertations – includes 4 essays:
  - "The Natural History of Religion"
  - "Of the Passions"
  - "Of Tragedy"
  - "Of the Standard of Taste"
- 1754–1762. The History of England – sometimes referred to as The History of Great Britain.
  - More a category of books than a single work, Hume's history spanned "from the invasion of Julius Caesar to the Revolution of 1688" and went through over 100 editions. Many considered it the standard history of England in its day.
- 1760. "Sister Peg"
  - Hume claimed to have authored an anonymous political pamphlet satirising the failure of the British Parliament to create a Scottish militia in 1760. Although the authorship of the work is disputed, Hume wrote Alexander Carlyle in early 1761 claiming authorship. The readership of the time attributed the work to Adam Ferguson, a friend and associate of Hume's who has been sometimes called "the founder of modern sociology". Some contemporary scholars concur in the judgement that Ferguson, not Hume, was the author of this work.
- 1776. "My Own Life."
  - Penned in April, shortly before his death, this autobiography was intended for inclusion in a new edition of Essays and Treatises on Several Subjects. It was first published by Adam Smith, who claimed that by doing so he had incurred "ten times more abuse than the very violent attack I had made upon the whole commercial system of Great Britain."
- 1777. "Essays on Suicide and the Immortality of the Soul."
- 1779. Dialogues Concerning Natural Religion.
  - Published posthumously by his nephew, David Hume the Younger. Being a discussion among three fictional characters concerning the nature of God, and is an important portrayal of the argument from design. Despite some controversy, most scholars agree that the view of Philo, the most sceptical of the three, comes closest to Hume's own.

== See also ==
- Age of Enlightenment
- George Anderson
- Human science
- Hume Studies
- Hume's principle
- Humeanism
- Mencius
- Scientific scepticism
- The Missing Shade of Blue
