= A General Theory of Exploitation and Class =

1982 book by John Roemer

- Cover of the first edition
- Author: John Roemer
- Language: English
- Subjects: Exploitation of labour Social class
- Publisher: Harvard University Press
- Publication date: 1982
- Publication place: United States
- Media type: Print (Hardcover and Paperback)
- Pages: 298
- ISBN: 978-0674344402

A General Theory of Exploitation and Class is a 1982 book about the exploitation of labour and social class written by the economist and political scientist John Roemer. The book was first published in the United States by Harvard University Press.

The book received positive reviews, and it was discussed in a dedicated issue of Politics & Society. However, reviewers described Roemer's conclusions as controversial. A General Theory of Exploitation and Class is considered part of analytical Marxism.

== Summary ==
Roemer aims to "embed the Marxian theory of exploitation in a more general theory of exploitation which will be capable of specializing to cases other than capitalism", and in particular to socialism. He argues that this would make it possible to "propose a theory of exploitation and class for socialism which can provide a basis for a materialist political theory of socialism." He also discusses the labor theory of value.

The book explores a variety of economic models, and is organized into three parts. In part one, Roemer presents the Marxian idea that those with fewer productive assets who sell labor are exploited by those with more productive assets who hire labor. In part two, Roemer points out that when economic participants have different levels of skill, or "labor power", there may exist wealthy laborers and poor employers. In part three, he describes this as a problem with the Marxian theory of exploitation and presents his general theory of exploitation, which dispenses with the labor theory of value and focuses on "property relations". He then uses his theory to explain the exploitation that exists in socialist countries and discusses his theory in relation to historical materialism.

== Reception ==
A General Theory of Exploitation and Class received positive reviews from Margaret Levi in the American Political Science Review and Trond Petersen in Acta Sociologica, and a mixed review from Michael A. Lebowitz in the Canadian Journal of Economics.

Levi described the book as "extremely ambitious and important" but also controversial. She credited Roemer with providing an alternative to traditional ways of thinking about exploitation and class, and praised his "grandeur of vision" and "brilliance of argument and insight". However, she wrote that the book also had "serious failings", citing an issue of Politics & Society where Roemer had been criticized by the sociologist Erik Olin Wright, the philosopher Andrew Levine, the social and political theorist Jon Elster, and Levi herself. Petersen described the book as "a novel and controversial contribution to the Marxian theory of exploitation and class", noting that it had received praise from political scientists, sociologists, mathematical economists, and philosophers and that Politics & Society had devoted an entire issue to it. He believed that its results would challenge both Marxist and non-Marxist social science. However, he noted that the assumptions underlying Roemer's methodology were open to question. He compared Roemer's views to those of the sociologist Max Weber.

Lebowitz wrote that Roemer employed elegant models and techniques and offered admirable discussions of many issues. However, he questioned Roemer's treatment of Marxian theory and "the character of modern socialist states", arguing that Roemer's conclusions rested on flawed assumptions. Nevertheless, he concluded that Roemer had taken "the consideration of exploitation on to a new, promising terrain".

A General Theory of Exploitation and Class is considered a representative work of analytical Marxism, comparable to the philosopher G. A. Cohen's Karl Marx's Theory of History (1978) and Elster's Making Sense of Marx (1985). The book is the classic reconstruction of theories of exploitation and class within analytical Marxism, and forms part of a highly influential body of work on exploitation. However, Roemer noted that after the publication of A General Theory of Exploitation and Class, several good criticisms had been made of the "property-relations definition of capitalist exploitation" he advanced in the work, and that he had revised his thinking in response. Wright and Levine, writing with the philosopher Elliott Sober, noted that Marxists tend to define classes in terms of the mechanisms by which surplus products or surplus labor are appropriated, rather than by property relations as such. They credited Roemer with presenting "an important dissenting view in which a property-relations definition of class is defended in Marxist terms".
