= John Roemer =

American economist (born 1945)

- Born: John E. Roemer; February 1, 1945 (age 81); Washington, D.C., U.S.
- Spouse: Natasha Roemer
- Mother: Ruth Roemer

Academic background
- Education: Harvard University (AB); University of California, Berkeley (PhD)

Academic work
- Discipline: Economics, political science
- Sub-discipline: Political economy, Marxian economics, Distributive justice
- School or tradition: Analytical Marxism, September Group
- Institutions: University of California, Davis; Yale University

John E. Roemer (/ˈroʊmər/; born February 1, 1945) is an American economist and political scientist.

He is the Elizabeth S. and A. Varick Stout Professor of Political Science and Economics at Yale University. Before Yale, he was on the economics faculty at the University of California, Davis, and before entering academia Roemer worked for several years as a labor organizer. He is married to Natasha Roemer, with whom he has two daughters.

== Biography ==
Roemer was born in Washington, D.C. to Ruth Roemer and Milton Roemer.

Roemer received his A.B. in mathematics summa cum laude from Harvard in 1966. He then enrolled as a graduate student in mathematics at the University of California, Berkeley. He became intensely involved in the anti-Vietnam-War movement, transferred to the doctoral program in economics, and was suspended by the university for his political activities. He taught mathematics in San Francisco secondary schools for five years. Eventually he returned to Berkeley and received his Ph.D. in economics in 1974.

Roemer is fellow of the Econometric Society, a past Guggenheim fellow and Russell Sage fellow, a member of American Academy of Arts and Sciences, and a corresponding fellow of the British Academy. He was past president of the Society for Social Choice and Welfare and served on the editorial boards of many journals in economics, political science, and philosophy. Roemer served on the advisory board of Academics Stand Against Poverty (ASAP).

== Academic contributions ==
Roemer has contributed mainly to six areas: Marxian economics, distributive justice, political competition, equity and climate change, and the theory of cooperation.

=== Marxian economics ===
Roemer's early work was an attempt to state the main themes of Marxian economics using the tools of general equilibrium and game theory. In Roemer (1982), he proposed a model of agents who were differentiated by their endowments and had to choose occupations—involving either selling labor, hiring labor, or working on one's own capital stock. In optimizing with respect to market prices, agents choose one of five class positions, each consisting of various combinations of these three activities. This gives rise to a class structure, whose agricultural nomenclature would be landlords (who only hire labor), rich peasants (who hire labor and work themselves on their fields), middle peasants (who only work for themselves and do not participate in the labor market), poor peasants (who work on their own plot and sell labor), and landless laborers (who only sell labor). Independently of this taxonomy, individuals are either exploiters or exploited, depending upon whether they consume goods embodying more or less labor than they expend. The central result, the Class Exploitation Correspondence Principle (CECP), states that individuals who optimize by hiring labor are necessarily exploiters, and those who optimize by selling labor are exploited. Thus, a classical Marxian principle, taken as an observed fact in Marx's writings, emerges here as a theorem. Microfoundations are provided for the relationship between exploitation and class.

In simple models (e.g., that of Leontief), the definition of 'labor embodied in goods' is straightforward. With more complicated production sets, it is not, and hence the definition of exploitation is not obvious. Roemer's program was then to propose definitions of embodied labor time, for economies with more general production sets, which would preserve the CECP. This led to the observation that, for general production sets, embodied labor time cannot be defined before one knows equilibrium prices. Thus, contrary to Marx, labor value is not a concept which is more fundamental than prices. Roemer's work is considered one of the seminal works of Analytical marxism.

=== Distributive justice ===
Roemer's work on exploitation led him to believe that the fundamental cause of exploitation was inequality of ownership of productive assets, rather than the kind of oppression that occurs in the labor process at the point of production—the latter view was held by many in the 'New Left' (see, e.g., Braverman 1974). While writing A General Theory of Exploitation and Class (1982), Roemer met the philosopher G. A. Cohen and the political theorist Jon Elster: they and others became known as the "September Group," encompassing like-minded Marxists, young social scientists and philosophers who saw their task as reconstructing Marxism on solid analytic foundations, using modern techniques. Roemer joined this group in 1981. He was strongly influenced by Cohen, whose work Karl Marx's Theory of History: A Defence (1978) was to become the gold standard of analytical Marxism. Having decided that inequality of asset ownership was the key culprit in capitalist inequality, Roemer, under Cohen's influence, began reading philosophical work on equality. He was impressed with Ronald Dworkin's (1981a, 1981b) writings, advocating a kind of resource egalitarianism. But in Roemer (1985), he showed that the hypothetical insurance market which Dworkin postulated to take place behind a veil of ignorance did not suffice to compensate those with a poor endowment of natural talents or bad luck in the birth lottery, as Dworkin had intended. In fact, pathologically, Dworkin's insurance market could transfer wealth from disabled to able persons. Influenced as well by Richard Arneson's (1989) proposal, Roemer (1993) proposed a conception of equality of opportunity, which attempted to carry out Dworkin's and Arneson's program—that is, to compensate persons for bad luck in the birth lottery, but to hold them responsible for their choices, or effort. He expanded this theory in Roemer (1996, 1998, 2012), where he proposed an algorithm whereby a society could equalize opportunities for a given objective (wage earning capacity, income, health), consonant with its own view of what factors individuals should be held responsible for, and what factors demanded compensation. Roemer and collaborators have produced a number of applications of this approach (Roemer et al. 2001; Llavador and Roemer 2001; Betts and Roemer 2007; Keane and Roemer 2009; Bjorkund, Jantti, and Roemer 2012). The World Bank (2006, 2009) has employed this approach to evaluate inequality of opportunity in developing countries.

=== Political competition ===
Roemer was naturally interested in the 'democratic class struggle,' that is, the manner in which classes in democracies contest their opposing interests. He was dissatisfied with the reigning concept of political equilibrium, Hotelling-Downs equilibrium, for several reasons: first, it conceptualizes political actors as caring only about winning elections, rather than representing constituents, and second, the concept is extremely fragile, as equilibrium exists, generically, only if the policy space is uni-dimensional. In Roemer (1999), he proposed a concept of political equilibrium in party competition, which exploited the idea that party organizations consist of factions. In one variant of the proposal, each party organization comprises three factions—the Militants, who wish to propose a policy which maximizes the average utility of the party's constituents, the Opportunists, who wish only to maximize the probability of victory, and the Reformists, who wish the maximize the expected utility of their constituents. An equilibrium consists of a policy proposal by each party, such that no party can deviate to another policy that would increase the payoffs of all three of its factions. This concept, called Party Unanimity Nash Equilibrium (PUNE), can be viewed as involving Nash bargaining among factions within each party, and Nash equilibrium between parties. As well as capturing what appears to happen in party competition, PUNE has the virtue that it exists regardless of the dimension of the policy space. (In fact, with two parties, a two-dimensional set or manifold of equilibria generically exist, under reasonable conditions.) This theory was extended and applied to a number of examples in Roemer (2001). In Roemer, Lee and Van der Straeten (2006), it was applied to analyze elections in four countries, where the two dimensions of policy were postulated to be taxes and immigration (or the race question). In Roemer (2006), a dynamic model was studied, where the question posed is whether political competition over the long period would tend to produce more economic equality, through democratically chosen policies of educational finance.

=== Equity and climate change ===
With collaborators Humberto Llavador and Joaquim Silvestre, Roemer has elaborated a formal theory of sustainability, which the authors apply to the problem of climate change (Llavador, Roemer, and Silvestre 2010 and 2011). Rather than maximizing a sum of discounted generational utilities into the future, which is the virtually ubiquitous practice of economists working on climate change, the authors maximize an objective which sustains welfare at the highest feasible level, or sustains growth in welfare at a chosen growth rate. Roemer (2011) critiques the discounted utilitarian approach. In Llavador, Roemer, and Silvestre (2012) the authors propose how the bargaining problem between the global North and South can be resolved, over the allocation of rights to emit greenhouse gases. The proposal does not begin from an ethical position which postulates an a priori distribution of pollution rights to nations, but rather with a politically motivated postulate that the authors argue is necessary and sufficient for an agreement to be reached.

=== Cooperation ===
Although evolutionary biologists, anthropologists, and behavioral economists increasingly view Homo sapiens as a cooperative species, almost all of economic theory assumes non-cooperative behavior: general equilibrium theory and non-cooperative game theory are the main tools. Even 'cooperative' game theory does not model cooperation but treats it as a black box: the values of coalitions in a cooperative game are taken as given, and it is not explained how coalitions produce these values. In Roemer and Silvestre (1993), the authors proved the existence, for quite general economic environments, of an allocation they called the proportional solution (PS): an allocation of goods and labor which is Pareto efficient, and in which each receives goods whose value (at supporting efficiency prices) is proportional to the value of their expended labor. In particular, if such an allocation could be realized, it would rectify the inefficiencies exhibited in the Nash equilibrium known as the tragedy of the commons. But how could it be realized? Roemer (1996) showed that the proportional solution is a 'Kantian equilibrium' of a natural game. In Nash equilibrium a player asks, autarkically, whether he can improve his payoff by altering his action, assuming all others' actions remain fixed. In Kantian equilibrium, a player only alters his labor supply by a certain multiple, if he would prefer that all players alter their labor supplies by the same multiple. In other words, he takes an action only if he prefers the situation in which his action is 'universalized.' A Kantian equilibrium is a vector of labor offers such that no player would like to multiply all offers by any non-negative number. This captures a kind of cooperation—agents do not contemplate deviating independently of others, but only in concert with others. In Roemer (2011), it is shown that, in a variety of games, Kantian equilibria deliver Pareto efficient allocations—they rectify the inefficiencies associated with Nash equilibrium. In particular, if a tribe of fishers, who live on a lake, learn to optimize in the Kantian manner, they will use the lake in an efficient manner, avoiding the tragedy of the commons.

== See also ==
- Roemer model of political competition
- Analytical marxism
