= The Journal of Ethics =

- Discipline: Philosophy
- Language: English
- Edited by: J. Angelo Corlett

Publication details
- History: 1997–present
- Publisher: Springer Netherlands
- Frequency: Quarterly

Standard abbreviations
- ISO 4: J. Ethics

Indexing
- ISSN: 1382-4554 (print); 1572-8609 (web)

Links
- Journal homepage; Online access

The Journal of Ethics is a philosophical academic journal focusing on ethics. Its editor-in-chief is J. Angelo Corlett.

The journal was established in 1997 and is published by Springer Netherlands. Notable contributors are Richard Arneson, Simon Blackburn, G. A. Cohen, Ronald Dworkin, John Martin Fischer, Harry Frankfurt, Margaret Gilbert, Robert E. Goodin, Gilbert Harman, Ted Honderich, Shelly Kagan, Frances Kamm, Christine Korsgaard, Michael McKenna, Jeff McMahan, Martha Nussbaum, Thomas Pogge, Henry S. Richardson, Peter Singer, Peter Vallentyne, Peter van Inwagen, Jeremy Waldron, and Jonathan Wolff.
