= Range property =

In philosophy, especially political philosophy, a range property is a property that is possessed equally by all beings or persons who meet certain conditions, even though the underlying capacities or features on which it is based may vary by degree. The concept is used in discussions of basic equality to explain how people may differ in capacities such as rationality, moral agency, or a sense of justice while still sharing equal moral or political status.

== Definition ==
A range property is a property possessed equally by all entities that fall within a certain range, even though they may differ in the underlying features by which they fall within that range. John Rawls, who is most closely associated with the term, illustrates the idea with the property of being inside the unit circle: points inside the circle have different coordinates, but no interior point is more or less inside the circle than another interior point.

Jeremy Waldron gives a more formal account of the idea. For him, a range property is a binary, non-scalar property that applies when something falls within a specified range of a related scalar property.

== Use in political philosophy ==
=== John Rawls ===
John Rawls introduced the idea of a range property in his 1971 book A Theory of Justice. Rawls's problem was that citizens differ in natural talents, social position and developed capacities, yet his justice as fairness treats them as free and equal citizens. To resolve this, he introduces the range property of moral personality: the capacity for a conception of the good and the capacity for a sense of justice. He argued that citizens may have greater or lesser skills, talents and powers "above the line," but such variation has no bearing on equal political status, as long as they possess a moral personality.

Later commentators describe this as a threshold strategy: once a person is above the threshold, greater or lesser possession of the underlying capacities does not make the person more or less entitled to equal basic rights.

=== Jeremy Waldron ===
Jeremy Waldron used range properties in his work on basic equality. In his 2017 book One Another's Equals, he examines rationality, moral capacity, free will and the ability to love as range properties.

== Criticism ==
Some philosophers argue that range-property accounts must explain why the selected threshold is non-arbitrary. Richard Arneson objects that Rawls gives no plausible reason for why further variation in moral-personality capacities above the threshold should be irrelevant to moral status, and that Rawls does not specify the relevant threshold.
