= Conventionalism =

Philosophical belief that principles depend on societal agreements, not external reality

Conventionalism is the philosophical attitude that fundamental principles of a certain kind are grounded on (explicit or implicit) agreements in society, rather than on external reality. Unspoken rules play a key role in the philosophy's structure. Although this attitude is commonly held with respect to the rules of grammar, its application to the propositions of ethics, law, science, biology, mathematics, and logic is more controversial.

== Linguistics ==
The debate on linguistic conventionalism dates back to Plato's Cratylus and the philosophy of Kumārila Bhaṭṭa. It has been the standard position of modern linguistics since Ferdinand de Saussure's l'arbitraire du signe, but there have always been dissenting positions of phonosemantics, recently defended by Margaret Magnus and Vilayanur S. Ramachandran.

== Philosophy of mathematics ==
The French mathematician Henri Poincaré was among the first to articulate a conventionalist view. Poincaré's use of non-Euclidean geometries in his work on differential equations convinced him that Euclidean geometry should not be regarded as an a priori truth. He held that axioms in geometry should be chosen for the results they produce, not for their apparent coherence with – possibly flawed – human intuitions about the physical world.

== Epistemology ==
Conventionalism was adopted by logical positivists, chiefly A. J. Ayer and Carl Hempel, and extended to both mathematics and logic. To deny rationalism, Ayer sees two options for empiricism regarding the necessity of the truth of formal logic (and mathematics): 1) deny that they actually are necessary, and then account for why they only appear so, or 2) claim that the truths of logic and mathematics lack factual content – they are not "truths about the world" – and then explain how they are nevertheless true and informative. John Stuart Mill adopted the former, which Ayer criticized, opting himself for the latter. Ayer's argument relies primarily on the analytic/synthetic distinction.

The French philosopher Pierre Duhem espoused a broader conventionalist view encompassing all of science. Duhem was skeptical that human perceptions are sufficient to understand the "true," metaphysical nature of reality and argued that scientific laws should be valued mainly for their predictive power and correspondence with observations.

Karl Popper broadened the meaning of conventionalism still more. In The Logic of Scientific Discovery, he defined a "conventionalist stratagem" as any technique that is used by a theorist to evade the consequences of a falsifying observation or experiment. Popper identified four such stratagems:

- introducing an ad hoc hypothesis that makes the refuting evidence seem irrelevant;
- modifying the ostensive definitions so as to alter the content of a theory;
- doubting the reliability of the experimenter; declaring that the observations that threaten the tested theory are irrelevant;
- casting doubt on the acumen of the theorist when he does not produce ideas that can save the theory.

Popper argued that it was crucial to avoid conventionalist stratagems if falsifiability of a theory was to be preserved. It has been argued that the standard model of cosmology is built upon a set of conventionalist stratagems.

In the 1930s, a Polish philosopher Kazimierz Ajdukiewicz proposed a view that he called radical conventionalism – as opposed to moderate conventionalism developed by Henri Poincaré and Pierre Duhem. Radical conventionalism was originally outlined in The World-Picture and the Conceptual Apparatus, an article published in “Erkenntnis” in 1934. The theory can be characterized by the following theses: (1) there are languages or – as Ajdukiewicz used to say – conceptual apparatuses (schemes) which are not intertranslatable, (2) any knowledge must be articulate in one of those languages, (3) the choice of a language is arbitrary, and it is possible to change from one language to another. Therefore, there is a conventional or decisional element in all knowledge (including perceptual). In his later writings – under the influence of Alfred Tarski – Ajdukiewicz rejected radical conventionalism in favour of a semantic epistemology.

== Legal philosophy ==
Conventionalism, as applied to legal philosophy is one of the three rival conceptions of law constructed by American legal philosopher Ronald Dworkin in his work Law's Empire. The other two conceptions of law are legal pragmatism and law as integrity.

According to conventionalism as defined by Dworkin, a community's legal institutions should contain clear social conventions relied upon which rules are promulgated. Such rules will serve as the sole source of information for all the community members because they demarcate clearly all the circumstances in which state coercion will and will not be exercised.

Dworkin nonetheless has argued that this justification fails to fit with facts as there are many occasions wherein clear applicable legal rules are absent. It follows that, as he maintained, conventionalism can provide no valid ground for state coercion. Dworkin himself favored law as integrity as the best justification of state coercion.

One famous criticism of Dworkin's idea comes from Stanley Fish who argues that Dworkin, like the Critical Legal Studies movement, Marxists and adherents of feminist jurisprudence, was guilty of a false 'Theory Hope'. Fish claims that such mistake stems from their mistaken belief that there exists a general or higher 'theory' that explains or constrains all fields of activity like state coercion.

Another criticism is based on Dworkin's assertion that positivists' claims amount to conventionalism. H. L. A. Hart, as a soft positivist, denies such claim as he had pointed out that citizens cannot always discover the law as plain matter of fact. It is however unclear as to whether Joseph Raz, an avowed hard positivist, can be classified as conventionalist as Raz has claimed that law is composed "exclusively" of social facts, which could be complex, and thus difficult to be discovered.

In particular, Dworkin has characterized law as having the main function of restraining state's coercion. Nigel Simmonds has rejected Dworkin's disapproval of conventionalism, claiming that his characterization of law is too narrow.

== See also ==
- French historical epistemology
- Émile Boutroux
- Consensus theory of truth

== Sources ==
- The Internet Encyclopedia of Philosophy entry on Henri Poincaré
- "Pierre Duhem". Notes by David Huron
- Mary Jo Nye, "The Boutroux Circle and Poincare's Conventionalism," Journal of the History of Ideas, Vol. 40, No. 1. (Jan. – Mar., 1979), pp. 107–120.
