= History, Labour, and Freedom =

1988 book by G. A. Cohen

History, Labour, and Freedom: Themes from Marx
- Cover
- Author: G. A. Cohen
- Language: English
- Subject: Political philosophy
- Publisher: Oxford University Press
- Publication date: 1988
- Media type: Print (hardcover and paperback)
- Pages: 336
- ISBN: 978-0-19-824779-1

History, Labour, and Freedom: Themes from Marx is a 1988 book by the philosopher G. A. Cohen. This is a revision and expansion of Cohen's earlier Karl Marx's Theory of History: A Defence (1978). The work reprints several papers published in the 1970s and 1980s that challenged the idea that libertarianism advances freedom.

== Reception ==
History, Labour, and Freedom received a positive review from the political scientist David McLellan in Political Studies. The book was also reviewed by William H. Shaw in Inquiry, McLellan in The Times Literary Supplement, Daniel Little in Political Theory, and Andrew Levine in The Journal of Philosophy.

McLellan credited Cohen with "lucidity and sharpness of argument", and with offering important reformulations of the theory of historical revisionism put forward in Karl Marx's Theory of History (1978). He considered Cohen's "discussion of the strength of nonmaterial cultural elements such as religion and nationalism" particularly interesting, and found Cohen's discussion of the questions of how capitalism should be overcome, what form socialist society should take, and "the practical implications of the changing nature of the working class" to be "stimulating and relevant".

== See also ==
- Analytical Marxism
