= Seana Shiffrin =

American philosopher (born 1969)

- Born: Seana Valentine Shiffrin; 1969 (age 56–57)

Education
- Education: University of California, Berkeley (BA); University College, Oxford (BPhil, DPhil); Harvard University (JD)
- Thesis: Consent and the Morality of Procreation (1993)
- Doctoral advisor: G. A. Cohen

Philosophical work
- Era: Contemporary philosophy
- Region: Western philosophy
- School: Analytic philosophy
- Institutions: University of California, Los Angeles
- Main interests: Political philosophy, ethics, philosophy of law
- Notable ideas: Thinker-based theory of freedom of speech, non-comparative theory of harm, non-conventionalist theory of promising

Seana Valentine Shiffrin (born 1969) is an American philosopher and Professor of Philosophy and Pete Kameron Professor of Law and Social Justice at the University of California, Los Angeles. Shiffrin's work spans issues in moral, political and legal philosophy, as well as matters of legal doctrine, that concern equality, autonomy and the social conditions for their realization. She is an associate editor of Philosophy and Public Affairs and was elected a Fellow of the American Academy of Arts and Sciences in 2010.

== Education and career ==
Shiffrin received her BA in philosophy from the University of California, Berkeley, in 1988, winning the University Medal. As a Marshall Scholar, she went on to obtain a BPhil, with distinction, from University College, Oxford, in 1990. She earned a PhD at Oxford University in 1993 under the supervision of G. A. Cohen, and then a JD magna cum laude from Harvard Law School in 1996.

She is winner of the Fred Berger Memorial Prize in Philosophy of Law in 2002 for her widely cited article, "Paternalism, Unconscionability, and Accommodation". She was also the Hempel Lecturer at Princeton University in 2012.

== Philosophical work ==
Shiffrin's recent work has primarily focused on freedom of speech, truth-telling, promising, and the place of the law in building moral character.

Shiffrin argues that although liberalism may preclude legal enforcement of morality for its own sake, the law cannot be indifferent to morality but must promote the social conditions of fostering and sustaining moral agency and moral deliberation. A connected theme she emphasizes is the role of equality and equal social relationships in rendering individual autonomy possible and meaningful. She has pursued these themes predominately through her non-conventionalist account of promising, her controversial argument that contract law should be more sensitive to its relationship to the moral practice of promising, her critique of luck-egalitarian conceptions of egalitarianism as incompatible with liberal freedoms that require accommodation practices, and also through the development of her thinker-based theory of freedom of speech. She is also cited for her critique of Lockean arguments for intellectual property, for her efforts to develop a non-comparative theory of harm, and for her argument that the federal law authorizing exploitative penalty fees for minor breaches of credit card contracts violates constitutional due process guarantees against disproportionate punitive damages.

Her first book, Speech Matters: On Morality, Lying and the Law, appeared in 2014 from Princeton University Press. Her second book, Democratic Law (Oxford University Press, 2021), is a published version of her Tanner Lectures at UC Berkeley. The book also features the remarks of her commentators, Niko Kolodny, Anna Stilz, and Richard Brooks, Shiffrin’s replies, and a substantive introduction by Hannah Ginsborg, the book’s editor.

== Selected works ==
- "Harm and Its Moral Significance", 18 Legal Theory 1–42 (2012).
- "A Thinker-Based Approach to Freedom of Speech", 27 Constitutional Commentary 283–307 (2011).
- "Inducing Moral Deliberation: On the Occasional Virtues of Fog", 123 Harvard Law Review 1214–46 (2010).
- "Promising, Intimate Relationships, and Conventionalism", 117 Philosophical Review 481–524 (2008).
- "The Divergence of Contract and Promise," 120 Harvard Law Review 708–753 (January 2007).
- "Are Credit Card Late Fees Unconstitutional?", 15 William & Mary Bill of Rights Journal 457–500 (2006).
- "Egalitarianism, Choice-Sensitivity, and Accommodation", in Reason and Value: Themes from the Work of Joseph Raz, 270–302 (edited by Philip Pettit, et al., Oxford University Press, 2004).
- "What Is Really Wrong with Compelled Association?", 99 Northwestern University Law Review 839–88 (2005).
- "Race, Labor, and the Fair Equality of Opportunity Principle", 72 Fordham Law Review 1643–75 (2004).
- "Speech, Death, and Double Effect", 78 NYU Law Review 1135–85 (2003).
- "Lockean Theories of Intellectual Property", in New Essays in the Political Theory of Property 138–67 (edited by Stephen R. Munzer, Cambridge University Press, 2001)
- "Paternalism, Unconscionability Doctrine, and Accommodation", 29 Philosophy and Public Affairs, 205–250 (Summer 2000) [reprinted in Jules Coleman and Joel Feinberg eds., Philosophy of Law, (2003), (2007)].
