= An Introduction to Karl Marx =

1986 book by Jon Elster

- Cover of the first edition
- Author: Jon Elster
- Language: English
- Subject: Karl Marx
- Published: 1986
- Media type: Print (hardcover · paperback)
- Pages: 212
- ISBN: 978-0521338318

An Introduction to Karl Marx is a 1986 book about the philosopher Karl Marx by the social and political theorist Jon Elster. It is a much shorter version (about one-fourth in length) of Elster's Making Sense of Marx, published a year earlier.

Elster also edited a companion volume of selected writings by Marx, organizing along thematic lines corresponding to the book's chapters 2–9, on the topics of Marxian methodology, alienation, Marxian economics, exploitation, historical materialism, class consciousness and class struggle, Marx's theory of politics, and the Marxist critique of ideology.

== Reception ==
The political scientist David McLellan praised the work for its rigor and accessibility.
