= Jon Elster =

Norwegian social and political theorist (born 1940)

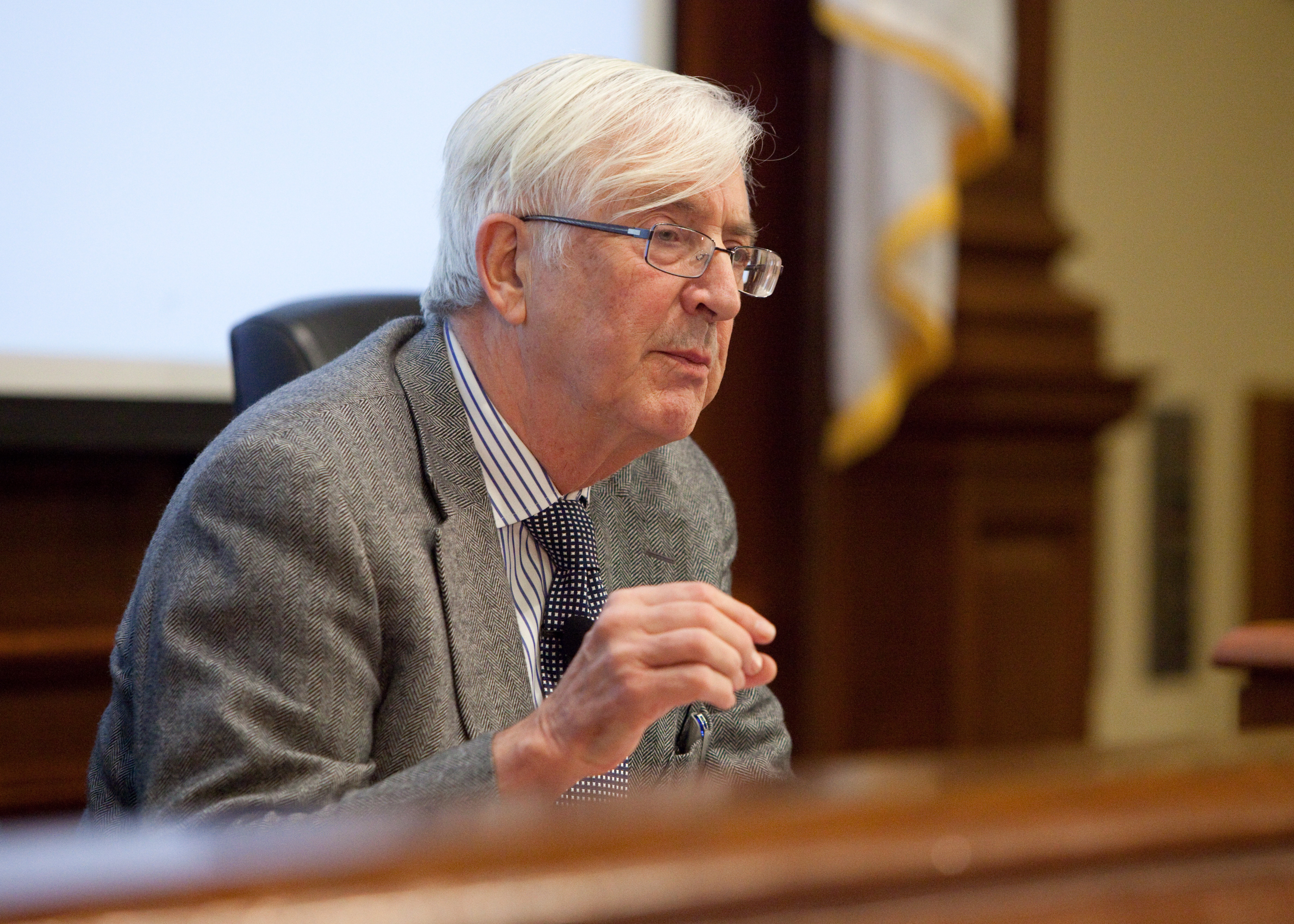
- Jon Elster in 2010
- Born: February 22, 1940 (age 86); Oslo, Norway
- Parent(s): Torolf Elster; Magli Elster
- Awards: Jean Nicod Prize (1997); John von Neumann Award (2002); Johan Skytte Prize in Political Science (2016)

Academic background
- Education: École Normale Superieure (PhD)
- Doctoral advisor: Raymond Aron

Academic work
- Discipline: Philosophy; Political science; Social sciences
- Sub-discipline: Political theory; Rational choice theory; Philosophy of social science
- School or tradition: Analytic philosophy; Analytical Marxism; September Group
- Institutions: University of Paris I; University of Oslo; University of Chicago; Collège de France; Columbia University

Jon Elster (/ˈɛlstər/; born 22 February 1940) is a Norwegian philosopher and political theorist who holds the Robert K. Merton professorship of Social Science at Columbia University and since 2005 professor of social science at the Collège de France.

He received his PhD in social science from the École Normale Superieure in 1972. He has previously taught at the University of Paris, the University of Oslo, and the University of Chicago, where he became professor of political science in 1984. Since 1995, he has held the Robert K. Merton professorship of Social Science at Columbia University, as well as being professor of social science at the Collège de France since 2005.

Elster has authored works in the philosophy of social science and rational choice theory. He is also a notable proponent of analytical Marxism, was a leading member of the September Group, which attempted to reinterpret Marxism on the basis of analytic philosophy, and a critic of neoclassical economics and public choice theory, largely on behavioral and psychological grounds. In 2016, he was awarded the 22nd Johan Skytte Prize in Political Science for his contributions to political science.

== Biography ==
Elster is the son of journalist/author and CEO of the Norwegian Broadcasting Corporation Torolf Elster, and poet Magli Elster. He earned his PhD in 1972 from the École Normale Superieure in Paris with a dissertation on Karl Marx under the direction of Raymond Aron. Elster was a member of the September Group for many years but left in the early 1990s. Elster previously taught at the University of Oslo in the department of history and held an endowed chair at the University of Chicago, teaching in the departments of philosophy and political science. He is now Robert K. Merton Professor of Social Sciences with appointments in Political Science and Philosophy at Columbia University and professeur honoraire at the Collège de France. He was awarded the Jean Nicod Prize in 1997, the John von Neumann Award in 2002, and the Skytte Prize in Political Science in 2016.

He is a member of the Norwegian Academy of Science and Letters. He is also a member of the American Academy of Arts and Sciences, of the American Philosophical Society, of the Academia Europaea, and a Corresponding Fellow of the British Academy.

Elster is doctor honoris causa at the universities of Valencia, Stockholm, Oslo, Trondheim (NTNU), Louvain-la-Neuve, Torcuato di Tella, and the National University of Colombia. He is honorary professor at the University of Chongqing.

== Philosophical work ==
Much of Elster's writing is characterized by attempts to use analytical theories, especially rational choice theory, as a springboard for philosophical and ethical analysis, with numerous examples from literature and history. "Elster has made important contributions to several fields," Daniel Little wrote in a review essay. "The breadth and depth of his writings are striking in a time of high specialisation; he is read and discussed by political scientists, legal scholars, economists and philosophers. His work is difficult to summarise in a slogan, but ... it is generally informed by a broad and deep acquaintance with relevant literature in economics, political science, history, philosophy, and psychology."

A student of the philosophy of social science (a topic he investigated through case studies in Explaining Technical Change), Elster strongly argued that social scientific explanations had to be built on top of methodological individualism (the belief that only individuals, not larger entities like "organizations" or "societies", can actually do things) and microfoundations (explaining big societal changes in terms of individual actions). He criticized Marxists and other social scientists for believing in functionalism (the belief that institutions exist because of their effect on society) and instead tried to give Marxism a foundation in game theory (the economic notion that people make choices based on the expected benefits and the choices others are likely to make).

Elster wrote numerous books attempting to use rational choice theory for a wide variety of social explanations. "Rational choice theory is far more than a technical tool for explaining behaviour," he once wrote. "It is also, and very importantly, a way of coming to grips with ourselves - not only what we should do, but even what we should be." He attempted to apply it to topics as varied as politics (Political Psychology), bias and constrained preferences (Sour Grapes), emotions (Alchemies of the Mind), self-restraint (Ulysses and the Sirens, which was selected for the Norwegian Sociology Canon), Marxism (Making Sense of Marx), and more.

In doing so, he elucidated many issues with simplistic notions of rational choice: endogenous preference formation (certain actions today can change preferences tomorrow, so how does one decide which preferences one prefers?), framing (people express different preferences when the same question is asked different ways), imperfect rationality (weakness of the will, emotion, impulsiveness, habit, self-deception) and our adjustments for it, and time preferences, among others.

As time went on Elster began to sour on rational choice. A 1991 review in the London Review of Books noted "Elster has lost his bearings, or at least his faith. [His latest books], he says, 'reflects an increasing disillusion with the power of reason'." His magisterial 500-page book Explaining Social Behavior includes something of a recantation:

I now believe that rational-choice theory has less explanatory power than I used to think. Do real people act on the calculations that make up many pages of mathematical appendixes in leading journals? I do not think so. ... There is no general nonintentional mechanism that can simulate or mimic rationality. ... At the same time, the empirical support ... tends to be quite weak. This is of course a sweeping statement. ... let me simply point out the high level of disagreement among competent scholars ... fundamental, persistent disagreements among 'schools.' We never observe the kind of many-decimal-points precision that would put controversy to rest.

The book discusses both rational behavior, but also irrational behavior, which Elster says is "widespread and frequent [but] not inevitable ... we want to be rational". A more recent book, Le désintéressement (part of a two-volume Traité critique de l’homme économique), explores the ramifications of these insights for the possibility of disinterested action.

== Selected writings ==
- Leibniz et la formation de l'esprit capitaliste (Paris, 1975) ISBN 2-7007-0018-X
- Leibniz and the development of economic rationality (Oslo, 1975)
- Logic and Society (New York, 1978)
- Ulysses and the Sirens (Cambridge, 1979)
- Sour grapes. Studies in the subversion of rationality (Cambridge University Press, 1983)
- Explaining Technical Change : a Case Study in the Philosophy of Science (Oslo, 1983)
- "One Hundred Years of Marxist Social Science". London Review of Books. Vol. 5, no. 11. 1983. Archived from the original on 23 June 2025.
- Making Sense of Marx. Studies in Marxism and Social Theory. Cambridge: Cambridge University Press. 1985. ISBN 978-0521297059.
- An Introduction to Karl Marx (Cambridge, 1986)
- The Cement of Society: A study of social order (Cambridge, 1989)
- Solomonic Judgments: Studies in the limitation of rationality (Cambridge, 1989)
- Nuts and Bolts for the Social Sciences (Cambridge, 1989)
- Local Justice: How institutions allocate scarce goods and necessary burdens (New York, 1992)
- Political Psychology (Cambridge, 1993)
- The Ethics of Medical Choice (with Nicolas Herpin; London, 1994)
- Strong Feelings: Emotion, Addiction, and Human Behavior (Cambridge, 1999)
- Alchemies of the Mind: Rationality and the Emotions (Cambridge, 1999)
- Ulysses Unbound: Studies in Rationality, Precommitment, and Constraints (Cambridge, 2000)
- Closing the Books: Transitional Justice in Historical Perspective (Cambridge, 2004)
- Explaining Social Behavior: More Nuts and Bolts for the Social Sciences (Cambridge, 2007; revised ed. 2015)
- Reason and Rationality (Princeton, 2009)
- Alexis de Tocqueville: The First Social Scientist (Cambridge, 2009)
- Le désintéressement (Paris, 2009)
- L'irrationalité (Paris, 2010)
- Securities against Misrule. Juries, Assemblies, Elections (Cambridge, 2013) ISBN 9781107649958
- Constituent Assemblies (edited with Roberto Gargarella, Vatsal Naresh and Bjørn Erik Rasch; Cambridge, 2019)
- France before 1789: The Unraveling of an Absolutist Regime (Princeton, 2020)
- America before 1787: The Unraveling of a Colonial Regime (Princeton, 2023)

== See also ==
- G. A. Cohen
- John Roemer
- List of Jean Nicod Prize laureates
