= Peidong Sun =

Chinese-American historian

- 孙沛东
- Born: 1976 (age 49–50); Tongchuan, Shaanxi
- Citizenship: United States
- Occupation: Historian

Academic background
- Education: Sciences Po (Ph.D.); Sun Yat-sen University (B.A., M.A., Ph.D.)
- Alma mater: Sciences Po; Sun Yat-sen University
- Thesis: Fashion and Politics: The Everyday Clothing Styles of the Guangdong Public, 1966–1976 (2007)
- Doctoral advisor: Nicolas Herpin

Academic work
- Era: 21st century
- Discipline: History, China studies, sociology
- School or tradition: Liberalism in China
- Institutions: Cornell University; Fudan University
- Main interests: History of the People’s Republic of China and the Chinese Communist Party

Peidong Sun (Chinese: 孙沛东; born 1976) is a Chinese-American historian and sociologist who currently serves as the Distinguished Associate Professor of Arts & Sciences in China and Asia-Pacific Studies and Associate Professor of History at Cornell University's department of history. Her academic research primarily investigates how the Chinese Communist Party’s governance has shaped everyday life, political consciousness, and historical memory in the history of the People's Republic of China.

== Life ==
Sun was born in Tongchuan, Shaanxi province. She completed her undergraduate studies at Sun Yat-sen University in 1999, where she majored in French and minored in Chinese. In 2002, she earned a master’s degree in French literature and sociology at the same institution, and then briefly taught at Guangzhou University. In 2007, Sun received her PhD in sociology from Sciences Po Paris and Sun Yat-sen University. During this period, she also conducted research at the Institute of Economic Sociology at Lumière University Lyon 2 under the French National Centre for Scientific Research.

She served as an Assistant Professor of Sociology at Shanghai University from 2007 to 2010, followed by a similar role at the East China University of Political Science and Law until 2013. That year, she joined the Department of History at Fudan University as an Associate Professor. During her years at Fudan, she held international fellowships, including a term as a visiting scholar at the Harvard-Yenching Institute (2016–2017) and as an Edward Teller Fellow at the Hoover Institution (2017–2018).

In 2019, Sun became a focal point of international discussions regarding academic freedom in China. After Fudan University amended its charter to remove references to "freedom of thought" and "academic independence" in favor of pledges to the Chinese Communist Party, Sun publicly criticized the move in interviews with international media, including The New York Times. Following her refusal to comply with demands from the party secretary of her department to write a formal self-criticism, she left China.

She subsequently served as a visiting professor at the Center for International Studies at Sciences Po (2020–2021). In 2021, she joined the faculty of Cornell University as an Associate Professor of History, and in 2022, she was also named a Distinguished Associate Professor of China and Asia-Pacific Studies.

== Research ==
Sun’s scholarship is characterized by its focus on history from below. Her 2012 monograph, Who is Marrying Whom? Matchmaking Corner in the People's Park, Shanghai, gained widespread attention for its analysis of how the social and political legacies of the Maoist era continue to influence contemporary Chinese marriage markets and urban parental anxieties.

She has also published extensively on the "sent-down youth" movement, specifically exploring the underground circulation of hand-copied literature (shouchaoben) as a form of intellectual survival and social networking among urban youth during the Cultural Revolution.

== Works ==
=== Books ===
- Unfiltered Regard for China: French Perspectives from Mao to Xi. London and New York: Routledge, 2025.
- Thornton, Patricia, Peidong Sun, and Chris Berry, eds. Red Shadows: Memories and Legacies of the Chinese Cultural Revolution. Cambridge: Cambridge University Press, 2017.
- Fashion and Politics: Everyday Clothing Practices in Guangdong during the Cultural Revolution. Beijing: People’s Publishing House, 2013.
- Who Will Marry My Daughter? The Parental Matchmaking Corner in Shanghai's People's Square. Beijing: China Social Sciences Press, 2012.

=== Articles ===
- Sun, Peidong. (2018). Governance, Diversity, and China Since the 1950s: An Interview with George P. Shultz. The Chinese Historical Review 25 (1): 67–80.
- Sun Peidong. (2016). The Collar Revolution: Everyday Clothing in Guangdong as Resistance in the Cultural Revolution. The China Quarterly 227: 773–795.
