= Interpretivism =

Interpretivism may refer to:

- Interpretivism (social science), an approach to social science that opposes the positivism of natural science
- Qualitative research, a method of inquiry in social science and related disciplines
- Interpretivism (legal), a school of thought in contemporary jurisprudence and the philosophy of law
