= Right to resist =

Human right

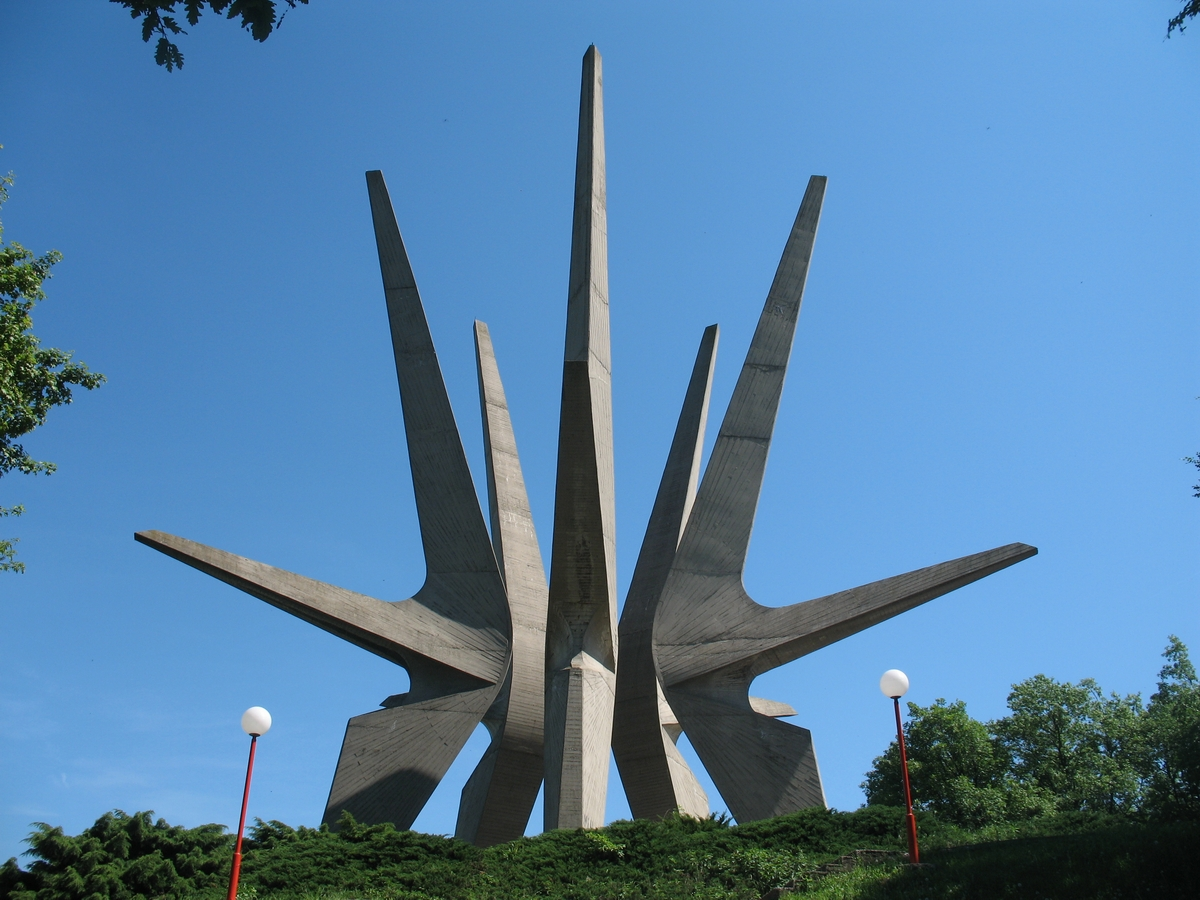
Memorial to Yugoslav Partisans in Serbia, an "intuitive case of resistance".

The right to resist is a human right, although its scope and content are controversial. The right to resist, depending on how it is defined, can take the form of civil disobedience or armed resistance against a tyrannical government or foreign occupation; whether it also extends to non-tyrannical governments is disputed. Although the distinguished jurist Hersch Lauterpacht called the right to resist the supreme human right, this right's position in international human rights law is tenuous and rarely discussed. Forty-two countries explicitly recognize a constitutional right to resist, as does the African Charter on Human and Peoples' Rights.

== History ==
According to philosopher Heiner Bielefeldt, "The question of the legitimacy of resistance—including violent resistance—against established authority is as old as political and social thought itself." The right to resist was encoded in the earliest versions of international law and in a variety of philosophical traditions. Support for the right to resist can be found in the ancient Greek doctrine of tyrannicide included in Roman law, as well as by concepts in the Hebrew Bible, jihad in the Muslim world, the Mandate of Heaven in dynastic Chinese political philosophy, and in Sub-Saharan Africa's oral traditions. Historically, Western thinkers have distinguished between despots and tyrants, only authorizing resistance against the latter because these rulers violated fundamental rights in addition to their lack of popular legitimacy. A few thinkers including Kant and Hobbes absolutely rejected the existence of a right to resist. John Locke accepted it only to protect property. Views differ on whether the right to resist goes beyond restoring the status quo or defending the constitutional order. Marxists went even farther than the authors of the French Revolution in supporting resistance to change the established order; Mao Zedong said that "it is right to rebel against reactionaries".

Although Hersch Lauterpacht, one of the most distinguished jurists, called the right to resist the supreme human right, this right's position in international human rights law is tenuous and rarely discussed. The United Nations' Special Rapporteur on Human Rights Defenders' mandate excludes anyone who does not use exclusively peaceful means, regardless of the severity of rights infringement. According to Shannonbrooke Murphy, the lack of respect for the right to resist is discordant with the reality that the United Nations itself and the entire architecture of human rights might not exist if their supporters had not resorted to the use of force against the Axis powers. Furthermore, Murphy argues that this rule is unfair to human rights defenders in the worst situations and its effect "has led to a perverse situation whereby international human rights law effectively abandons the majority of people facing grave or massive human rights violations". In 1964, Nelson Mandela defended the recourse to violence in the struggle against apartheid, in his speech "I Am Prepared to Die". According to political philosopher Gwilym David Blunt, "The right to resistance is a necessary part of the political conception of human rights". Without it, rights would only be privileges, but the right to resist provides "an ultimate remedy to human rights violations".

== Cases ==
=== Resistance vs. terrorism ===
National liberation movements using violence as occurred in Algeria, Palestine, and Ireland have often elicited mixed reactions, between being denounced as terrorism and the assertion that sometimes force is necessary to resist oppression. Political theorist Christopher Finlay wrote a book based on just war theory articulating when he believes armed resistance is justified. A specific example is the Palestinian right to resist the Israeli occupation of the Palestinian territories, which is denied by Israel.

==== Counterterrorism and resistance ====
Especially after the 9/11 attacks, state counterterrorism strategies included proscribing many organizations as terrorist organizations, even if they could be seen as exercising a legitimate right to resist in accordance with internationally recognized principles. In particular, states proscribing organizations that oppose these states poses a high risk of denial of the right to resist. Mark Muller QC cites the United Kingdom's Terrorism Act 2000 as a law that could potentially encompass any non-state organization carrying out an armed campaign and one that contains no exception for lawful exercise of self-determination or fighting against a nondemocratic and oppressive regime. To avoid the problem of competing legal frameworks that evaluate an action differently, Georg Gesk proposes that anti-terrorism laws should focus on obviously criminal actions that could not be justified regardless of the cause, while violent resistance against an allegedly unjust state should not be seen as terrorism unless proven to be the case.

=== Global poverty and injustice ===
Although political theorists have debated what obligations the wealthy have in light of global poverty and injustice, there has been less thought on what the victims of these regimes are entitled to do to achieve justice. According to political theorist Simon Caney, the downtrodden have a right to resist global injustice; "to engage in action that transforms the underlying social, economic, and political structures that perpetuate injustice in order to bring about greater justice in the future". Based on the principle of necessity, Caney argues that some people have the right to take direct action to immediately better their standard of living. Examples he gives include evading border controls; stealing essential food, medicine, or energy that they could not afford; and violating intellectual property law. A second type of resistance involves attempting to alter unjust global systems to bring about greater justice; he cites land occupations; obstruction and blockades, for example to protect the environment; sabotage; refusing to pay debt; rioting; and rebellion, for example the Haitian Revolution or anti-colonial wars. Blunt argues that poor people in the Global South have the right to resist their condition by immigrating to the Global North, even against the law; he analogizes this to slaves' right to resist by fleeing their masters.

== Legal provisions ==
There is no generally agreed legal definition of the right. Based on Tony Honoré, Murphy suggests that the "'right to resist' is the right, given certain conditions, to take action intended to effect social, political or economic change, including in some instances a right to commit acts that would ordinarily be unlawful". This right could be exercised individually or collectively, ranges from overthrow of the system through more limited goals, and encompasses all illegal actions from civil disobedience to violent resistance. This right is conditional on being necessary and proportionate to achieve an aim compatible with international human rights law, and could not justify infringing others' rights.

=== International law ===
In international law, the right to resist is closely related to the principle of self-determination. It is widely recognized that a right to self-determination arises in situations of colonial domination, foreign occupation, and racist regimes that deny a segment of the population political participation. According to international law, states may not use force against the lawful exercise of self-determination, while those seeking self-determination may use military force if there is no other way to achieve their goals. Fayez Sayegh derives a right to resist from the Charter of the United Nations' recognition of an inherent right of national self-defense in the face of aggression. Based on the charter, the 1970 United Nations General Assembly Resolution 2625 explicitly endorsed a right to resist "subjection of peoples to alien subjugation, domination and exploitation". Based on this, many scholars argue that the right to resist exists in customary international law where self-determination is at issue.

Some scholars have argued that a right to resist oppression is implicit in the International Bill of Human Rights. The preamble to the Universal Declaration of Human Rights states "whereas it is essential, if man is not to be compelled to have recourse, as a last resort, to rebellion against tyranny and oppression, that human rights should be protected by the rule of law". The drafters of the declaration, however, intended to exclude the right to resist. The European and Inter-American regional human rights treaties do not include a right to resist.

Article 20(2) of the African Charter on Human and Peoples' Rights states that "colonised or oppressed peoples" have a right "to free themselves from the bonds of domination by resorting to any means recognised by the international community". There is no similar provision in other human rights treaties. Murphy suggests that besides foreign invasion and occupation, "peoples facing massive violations amounting to crimes against humanity or genocide, coups d'état or other unconstitutional rule could qualify." The revised 2004 Arab Charter on Human Rights, but not its 1994 predecessor, grants an unqualified "right to resist foreign occupation".

=== Constitutions ===
Constitutional right to resist by country, dark red (current) light red (former)

The right to resist was granted by the Magna Carta and is one of the central elements of the Declaration of the Rights of Man and of the Citizen issued during the French Revolution in 1791. This provision is incorporated into the preamble of France's 1958 constitution. As of 2012, 42 countries recognize a right to resist in their constitution and another three formerly recognized such a right. Most of these countries are located in Latin America, Western Europe, or Africa. Most provisions were adopted in four waves: "revolutionary republican, post-fascist, post-colonial and post-Soviet". In Latin America, such constitutional provisions were commonly adopted in the aftermath of coups d'état, while elsewhere these provisions were intended as a forward thinking measure against democratic backsliding.

The philosophical basis of the constitutional right to resist differs; in some cases based on natural law; in others obliging the citizen to take action against unconstitutional seizure of power; and in a third set of countries authorizing action against state interference in individual rights. There is also variance in whether the right to resist is conceived as optional or a duty of citizens. The laws vary in scope; some grant the right to resist an unlawful coup or foreign aggression while others are more broad, encompassing human rights violations or other oppression.

Constitutional right to resist installed by revolutionary governments may later be cited by opponents of these regimes. In 1953, Fidel Castro was arrested for the attack on Moncada Barracks. In his defense speech, "History Will Absolve Me", he invoked the "universally recognized principle" and Cuba's constitutional right to resist.

The right of resistance granted in Article 20 Paragraph 4 of the Basic Law is part of the liberal democratic basic order of the Federal Republic of Germany and is considered a right that is equivalent to a fundamental right. This right was introduced as part of the 1968 German Emergency Acts and allows any German to resist anyone who undertakes to abolish the constitutional principles (Article 1-20 GG) when no other remedy is possible. Above all, it is directed against constitutional institutions themselves, which try to abolish the existing constitutional order through political decisions. This is based on the knowledge that constitutional institutions can behave unconstitutionally, even if they act on the basis of a law (Nazi seizure of power through the Enabling Act of 1933). The right of resistance is the result of a long historical development, which, based on an absolutist or legal positivist background, assumed that state action could never be wrong: "The King can do no wrong". Any criminal offenses committed and other violations of rights are justified by the right of resistance. However, the resister must always use the mildest means, if this is possible for him. Such a constitutional regulation is not very widespread worldwide.

In 2021, the Italian Supreme Court of Cassation overturned the conviction of two migrants in the Vos Thalassa case for a July 2018 protest on board the Vos Thalassa ship in which they resisted being returned to Libya, due to the risk of torture and mistreatment in that country.

== Sources ==
- Bielefeldt, Heiner (2003). "The Right to Resist". International Handbook of Violence Research. Springer Netherlands. pp. 1097–1111. ISBN 978-0-306-48039-3.
- Blunt, Gwilym David (2018). "Illegal Immigration as Resistance to Global Poverty". Raisons Politiques. 69 (1): 83–99. doi:10.3917/rai.069.0083. S2CID 150289731.
- Blunt, Gwilym David (2020). Global Poverty, Injustice, and Resistance. Cambridge University Press. ISBN 978-1-108-48012-3.
- Caney, Simon (2020). "The Right to Resist Global Injustice". The Oxford Handbook of Global Justice. Oxford University Press. ISBN 9780198714354.
- Douzinas, Costas (2014). "Philosophy and the right to resistance". The Meanings of Rights: The Philosophy and Social Theory of Human Rights. Cambridge University Press. pp. 85–105. ISBN 978-1-107-02785-5.
- Finlay, Christopher J. (2015). Terrorism and the Right to Resist: A Theory of Just Revolutionary War. Cambridge University Press. ISBN 978-1-316-35199-4.
- Francis, Sahar (2014). "Status of Palestinian Prisoners in International Humanitarian Law". Journal of Palestine Studies. 43 (4): 39–48. doi:10.1525/jps.2014.43.4.39.
- Gesk, Georg (2012). "Right to Resistance and Terrorism – the Example of Germany". German Law Journal. 13 (9): 1075–1094. doi:10.1017/S207183220001806X. S2CID 150841641.
- Ginsburg, Tom; Lansberg-Rodriguez, Daniel; Versteeg, Mila (2012–2013). "When to Overthrow Your Government: The Right to Resist in the World's Constitutions". UCLA Law Review. 60: 1184.
- Muller, Mark (2008). "Terrorism, Proscription and the Right to Resist in the Age of Conflict". Denning Law Journal. 20: 111–131. doi:10.5750/dlj.v20i1.327.
- Murphy, Shannonbrooke (2011). "Unique in international human rights law : article 20(2) and the right to resist in the African Charter on Human and Peoples' Rights". African Human Rights Law Journal. 11 (2): 465–494. hdl:10520/EJC51954.
- Murphy, Shannonbrooke (2012). "The Right to Resist Reconsidered". In Keane, David; McDermott, Yvonne (eds.). The Challenge of Human Rights: Past, Present and Future. Edward Elgar Publishing. doi:10.4337/9780857939012.00012. ISBN 978-0-85793-901-2.
- Sayegh, Fayez A. (1965). Zionist Colonialism in Palestine (PDF). Research Center-Palestine Liberation Organization.
- Turchetti, Mario (2006). "Droit de Résistance, à quoi ? Démasquer aujourd'hui le despotisme et la tyrannie" [The Right to Resist What? Defining Despotism and Tyranny Today]. Revue historique (in French). 640 (4): 831–871. doi:10.3917/rhis.064.0831. JSTOR 40957835.
