= Analyzing Marx =

1984 book by Richard W. Miller

Analyzing Marx: Morality, Power and History
- Cover
- Author: Richard W. Miller
- Language: English
- Subject: Karl Marx
- Published: 1984
- Publication place: United States
- Media type: Print (Hardcover and Paperback)
- Pages: 334
- ISBN: 978-0691014135

Analyzing Marx: Morality, Power and History is a 1984 book about the philosopher Karl Marx by the political philosopher Richard W. Miller.

== Reception ==
The sociologist Erik Olin Wright, Andrew Levine, and the philosopher Elliott Sober described Analyzing Marx as a representative work of Analytical Marxism. The philosopher Jan Narveson wrote that the book is, "an example of the lengths to which a sympathizer must go in attempting to retrieve a theory."

== See also ==
- Karl Marx: His Life and Environment
