= Ruth Roemer =

American lawyer and public health researcher

- Born: Ruth Joy Rosebaum; 1916; Hartford, Connecticut, US
- Died: August 1, 2005; Los Angeles, California, US
- Occupations: Lawyer, public health researcher

Ruth Roemer (1916 – August 1, 2005) was an American lawyer and public health researcher who championed the importance of human rights in the field of public health.

== Early life ==
Ruth Joy Rosebaum was born in Hartford, Connecticut, in 1916. Ruth was the elder of two girls; her younger sister was Hilda Rosebaum (Kahne). Their father, a plant pathologist, died at age 37 of a bacterial infection resulting from a tooth extraction. After their father's death, Mrs. Rosebaum moved the family to Milford, Connecticut, where Ruth spent the rest of her youth.

== Education ==
Rosebaum attended Cornell University and graduated in 1936 with a BA degree in English. She planned to teach, but changed her mind after traveling to post-WWI Europe with the American Student Union. Motivated by her travel experiences, upon her return she resolved to do something "socially relevant." She returned to Cornell University to study law, graduating from Cornell University Law School in 1939. While attending law school, Roemer co-edited the Cornell Journal of Opinion with fellow student Milton Roemer (namesake of Roemer's law), whom she married in 1938.

== Early career ==
After law school, Roemer represented the United Electrical Workers in Washington during the 1940s. Roemer and her husband moved to Geneva, Switzerland, in 1951, when he became the Chief of Social and Occupational Health for the newly formed World Health Organization (WHO). Soon after Milton Roemer's appointment at the WHO, the United States withdrew his appointment under the political pressure of the McCarthy era. In 1953 the Roemers moved to Saskastchewan, Canada. In Canada, Roemer worked as a researcher with the Royal Commission on Agriculture and Rural Life in Saskatchewan.

By the late 1950s, Roemer and her family had returned to the United States and Cornell University. At Cornell, Roemer worked with Professor Bertram F. Wilcox as the associate director of a research project investigating the admissions decisions of New York mental hospitals. Their research resulted in a book Mental Illness and Due Process which led to landmark New York state mental hospital admission policy legislation.

== UCLA ==
Roemer and her family moved to Los Angeles, California, in 1962, where she joined the health services faculty of University of California, Los Angeles School of Public Health. She soon became the vice president and principal organizer of the California Committee on Therapeutic Abortion. Roemer and her husband founded the national health law program at UCLA, which ultimately—with Roemer's support—became an independent organization, the National Health Law Program, in 1969.

Roemer is perhaps best known for her work crafting international tobacco control policy. A heavy smoker herself, Roemer switched from cigarettes to pipes in 1961 and quit smoking altogether in 1972. She and University of Maryland law professor, Allyn Taylor, outlined what would become the world's first public health treaty: the WHO Framework Convention on Tobacco Control. Ratified in 2003, 168 counties have signed the treaty.

In her tenure at UCLA, Roemer taught a generation of public health students and made significant contributions to the fields of women's reproductive rights, health-law, health workforce policy and tobacco legislation. Her publications include:

- Mental Illness and Due Process (1962)
- Public Hospitals under Private Management: The California Experience (1983)
- Legislative action to combat the world tobacco epidemic (WHO, 1992)
- Abortion law: the approaches of different nations (APHA, 1967)
- Origins of the WHO Framework Convention on Tobacco Control (2005)

Roemer was an active member of the American Public Health Association (APHA) since joining the organization in 1967. She served on several APHA committees and was elected president of the organization in October 1986 and served a one-year term. She was the seventh woman elected to the presidency of the association since it was founded in 1872.

Roemer taught health policy, law and ethics at UCLA's school of public health for over 40 years.

== Legacy ==
UCLA holds an annual symposium in Roemer's name, and presents the Ruth Roemer Social Justice Leadership Award to "those making a difference in advancing and protecting health in underserved communities or vulnerable populations".

Roemer and her husband set up an annual award for local health officers, the Milton and Ruth Roemer Prize for Creative Local Public Health Work. The prize is administered by the American Public Health Association.

== Personal life ==
Ruth and Milton Roemer had two children, John E. Roemer and Beth Roemer Lewis. Milton Roemer died of heart failure on January 3, 2001, at the age of 84. Ruth and Milton Roemer were married for 62 years.

Roemer died of cardiac arrest on August 1, 2005, at Kaiser Permanente Medical Center in West Los Angeles, California. She was 89 years old.

== Sources ==
- Gordon, Dan. "Ruth Roemer, Public Health." UCLA Spotlight, September 1, 2002
- Woo, Elaine. "Ruth Roemer, 89; Pioneer in Public Health Law Was Active in Tobacco, Abortion Issues." Los Angeles Times, August 5, 2005
- "Ruth Roemer: The Fighting Type." UCLA Public Health, June 2002
- "Ruth Roemer, JD Assumes APHA Presidency." AJPH. Vol. 77, No. 1, January 1987
- "Roemer, Ruth J. (nee Rosenbaum)" New York Times, August 7, 2005
- Oliver, Myrna. "Dr. Milton Roemer; Expert on Public Health Taught at UCLA." Los Angeles Times, January 10, 2001
- "Obituary Milton I. Roemer, 1916-2001." Bull World Health Organ. Vol. 79, No. 5, January 2001
- Conklin, Micki. ed. "Milton I. Roemer, Public Health: Los Angeles." University of California: In Memoriam, 2001
- Online Archive of California. "Finding Aid for the California Committee on Therapeutic Abortion Records, 1966-1974." Online Archive of California.
- National Health Law Program. "NHeLP Mourns Death of Co-Founder Ruth Roemer." National Health Law Program.
- Tobacco Documents Online. "Roemer, Ruth." Tobacco Documents Online.
