= Alan Ryan =

British philosopher (born 1940)

Alan Ryan FBA
- Born: Alan James Ryan; 9 May 1940 (age 86); London, England
- Spouse: Kate Ryan

Education
- Education: Balliol College, Oxford

Philosophical work
- Era: Contemporary philosophy
- Region: Western philosophy
- School: Analytic
- Institutions: University of Keele; University of Essex; New College, Oxford; Princeton University
- Doctoral students: Jeremy Waldron
- Main interests: Political philosophy

Alan James Ryan FBA (born 9 May 1940) is a British philosopher. He was Professor of Politics at the University of Oxford. He was also Warden of New College, Oxford, from 1996 to 2009. He retired as Professor Emeritus in September 2015 and lives in Summertown, Oxford.

== Biography ==
Ryan was born on 9 May 1940 in London, England. He was educated at Christ's Hospital, Balliol College, Oxford, and University College, London. Elected a fellow of New College in 1969, he later taught at Princeton University, and returned to New College, Oxford, in 1996 to take up the Wardenship. He was made a Fellow of the British Academy in 1986.

A political theorist and historian of political thought, Ryan is a recognized authority on the development of modern liberalism, especially the work of John Stuart Mill, having contributed directly to the 'Reversionary' school, which led to a re-examination of Mill's work from the 1970s. His academic work also takes in broader themes in political theory, including the philosophy of social science, the nature of property, the history of political thought, and liberalism of the 19th and 20th centuries.

Ryan has held positions at the Universities of Oxford, Essex, Keele and Princeton University and University of Virginia School of Law. He was also a Visiting Professor of Political Science at The University of Texas at Austin, Australian National University, The New School and many others.

Ryan is a regular contributor to The New York Review of Books, the London Review of Books, and The Times Literary Supplement, and continues to write on political theory and the history of political thought.

== Books ==
- The Philosophy of John Stuart Mill (1970): an examination of Mill's philosophy of science, its relation to his ethical thought, and a defence of the view that Mill's work is largely coherent, concentrating on Mill's A System of Logic.
- The Philosophy of the Social Sciences (1970): an introduction to the philosophy of social science.
- J.S. Mill (1975): a guide through the important works of Mill, and the themes to be found therein.
- Property and Political Theory (1984)
- Property (1987)
- Russell: A Political Life (1993)
- John Dewey and the High Tide of American Liberalism (1995)
- Liberal Anxieties and Liberal Education (1998): given as a lecture series at the University of California, Berkeley, contains autobiographical material.
- On Politics: A History of Political Thought: From Herodotus to the Present (2012) traces the origins of political philosophy from the ancient Greeks to Machiavelli in Book I and from Hobbes to the present age in Book II
- The Making of Modern Liberalism (2012) exploration of the origins and nature of liberalism from the Enlightenment through its triumphs and setbacks in the twentieth century
- On Machiavelli: The Search for Glory (2013): an analysis of Machiavelli's philosophy and its place in the politics of its time
