= Interpretivism (legal) =

Interpretivism is a school of thought in contemporary jurisprudence and the philosophy of law.

== Overview ==
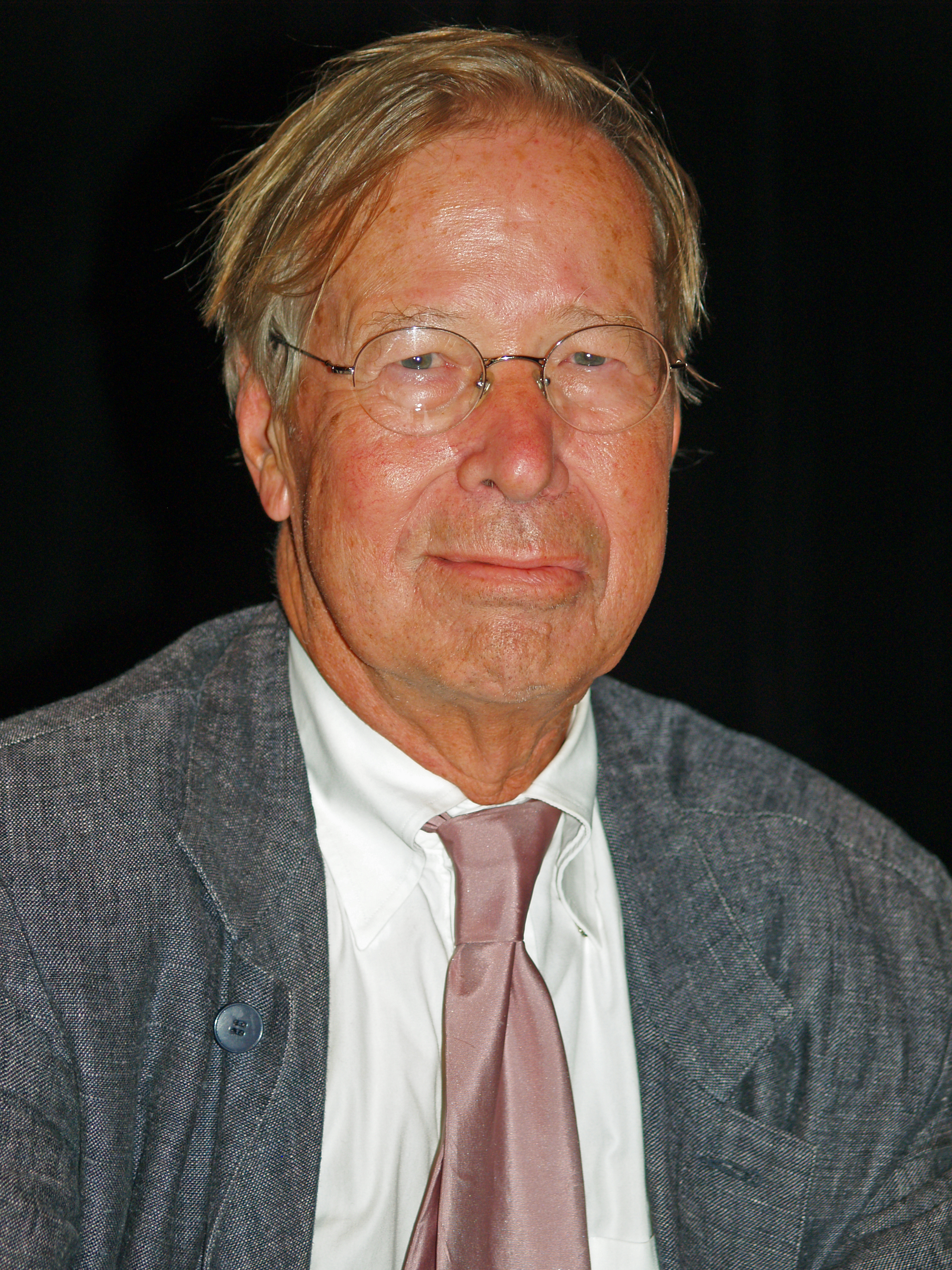
Ronald Dworkin is often associated with interpretivism

Interpretivism claims that Law is not a set of given data, conventions or physical facts, but what lawyers aim to construct or obtain in their practice. This marks a first difference between interpretivism and legal positivism. But the refusal that law be a set of given entities opposes interpretivism to natural law too. There is no separation between law and morality, although there are differences. This is not in accordance with the main claim of legal positivism. Law is not immanent in nature nor do legal values and principles exist independently and outside of the legal practice itself. This is the opposite of the main claim of natural law theory.

In the English-speaking world, interpretivism is usually identified with Ronald Dworkin's thesis on the nature of law as discussed in his text titled Law's Empire, which is sometimes seen as a third way between natural law and legal positivism.

The concept also includes continental legal hermeneutics and authors such as Helmut Coing and Emilio Betti. Legal hermeneutics can be seen as a branch of philosophical hermeneutics, whose main proponents in the 20th century are Martin Heidegger and Hans-Georg Gadamer, both drawing on Edmund Husserl's phenomenology. Hermeneutics has now expanded to many varied areas of research in the social sciences as an alternative to a conventionalist approach.

In a wider sense, interpretivism includes even the theses of, in chronological order, Josef Esser, Theodor Viehweg, Chaïm Perelman, Wolfgang Fikentscher, António Castanheira Neves, Friedrich Müller, Aulis Aarnio, and Robert Alexy.
