= Nicolas Herpin =

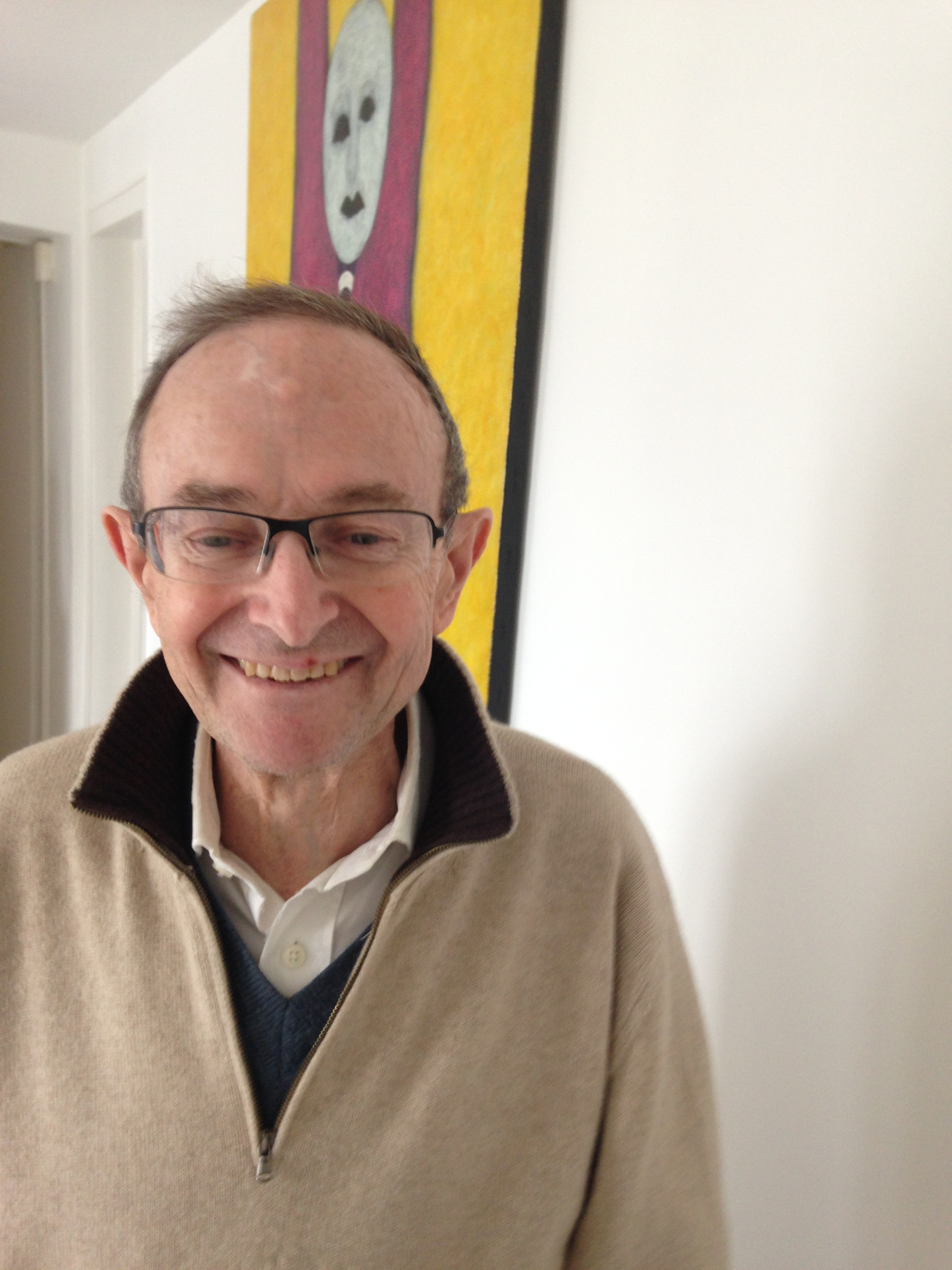
- Born: 1942 (age 83–84); Tours, France

Academic background
- Education: Sciences Po (PhD)
- Doctoral advisor: Raymond Aron

Academic work
- Discipline: Sociology
- Institutions: Sciences Po; INSEE; CNRS; University of Paris VIII

Nicolas Herpin (born 1942) is a French sociologist specializing in consumption. He is an emeritus Research Director at the French National Centre for Scientific Research (CNRS).

== Life ==
Born in Tours (Indre-et-Loire) in 1942, he completed his secondary education in Paris, and arned a degree in philosophy from the Sorbonne and a doctorate in Sociology under the supervision of Raymond Aron. His dissertation was published by the Presses Universitaires de France under the title: "Les sociologues américains et le siècle" (American sociologists and the century) (1973). He was a lecturer at the University of Paris VIII, then a Research Director at the French National Centre for Scientific Research in 1990. He is a member of the Observatoire Sociologique du Changement.

Between 1982 and 1986, he was seconded to the French National Centre for Scientific Research to conduct and analyze the "clothing" survey for the Institut national de la statistique et des études économiques (INSEE). In 1990, he became a research director at the French National Centre for Scientific Research. His research unit, the Sociological Observatory of Change (OSC), is located at Sciences Po Paris.

== Works ==
- Les Sociologues américains et le siècle, collection Sup dirigée par George Balandier, Presses Universitaires de France, 1973.
- L’application de la loi. Deux poids, deux mesures, collection Sociologie, Éditions du Seuil, Paris, 1977.
- The Ethics of Medical Choice (with Jon Elster; London, 1994).
- Le Pouvoir des grands. De l’influence de la taille des hommes sur leur statut social, collection Repères, La Découverte, Paris 2006.
- Sociologie de la consommation, collection Repères, troisième édition 2018, La Découverte.
