= Acta Sociologica =

- Discipline: Sociology
- Language: English
- Edited by: Jonas Toubøl, Mikael Carleheden

Publication details
- History: 1955–present
- Publisher: SAGE Publications
- Frequency: Quarterly
- Impact factor: 1.7 (2022)

Standard abbreviations
- ISO 4: Acta Sociol.

Indexing
- ISSN: 0001-6993 (print); 1502-3869 (web)
- LCCN: 58038086
- JSTOR: 00016993
- OCLC no.: 477218949

Links
- Journal homepage; Online access; Online archive

Acta Sociologica is a quarterly peer-reviewed academic journal covering all areas of sociology. It is an official journal of the Nordic Sociological Association and was established in 1955. It publishes papers on original research, book reviews, and review essays and focuses on research comparing Nordic countries with one another or with other countries. Nordic universities such as the University of Oslo, University of Copenhagen and University of Stockholm are among regular contributors to the journal.

== Abstracting and indexing ==
The journal is abstracted and indexed in Scopus, the Social Sciences Citation Index, and Cambridge Scientific Abstracts. According to the Journal Citation Reports, its 2022 impact factor is 1.7.
