= Jeremy Waldron =

New Zealand lawyer (born 1953)

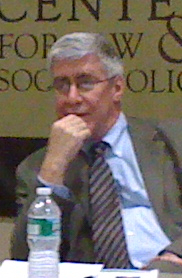
- Waldron in 2010
- Born: 13 October 1953 (age 73); Invercargill, New Zealand
- Partner: Carol Sanger

Education
- Education: University of Otago (BA, LLB); Lincoln College, Oxford (DPhil)
- Doctoral advisor: Ronald Dworkin; Alan Ryan

Philosophical work
- Era: Contemporary philosophy
- Region: Western philosophy
- School: Analytic; Legal positivism
- Institutions: University of Edinburgh; University of California, Berkeley; Princeton University; Columbia University; New York University; All Souls College, Oxford
- Main interests: Legal philosophy
- Notable ideas: Criticism of judicial review The defamatory character of hate speech Opposition to First Amendment protection for hate speech

Jeremy Waldron (/ˈwɔːldrən/; born 13 October 1953) is a New Zealand legal philosopher. He holds a University Professorship at the New York University School of Law, is affiliated with the New York University Department of Philosophy, and was formerly the Chichele Professor of Social and Political Theory at All Souls College, Oxford University. Waldron also holds an adjunct professorship at Victoria University of Wellington. Waldron is regarded as one of the world's leading legal and political philosophers.

== Early life and education ==
Waldron attended Southland Boys' High School, and then went on to study at the University of Otago, New Zealand, where he graduated with a B.A. in 1974 and an LL.B. in 1978. He later studied for a D.Phil. at Lincoln College, Oxford, under legal philosopher Ronald Dworkin and political theorist Alan Ryan; Waldron graduated in 1986.

== Career ==
He taught legal and political philosophy at Otago (1975–78), Lincoln College, Oxford (1980–82), the University of Edinburgh, Scotland (1983–87), the Jurisprudence and Social Policy Program at Berkeley Law (1986–96), Princeton University (1996–97), and Columbia Law School (1997–2006). He has also been a visiting professor at Cornell (1989–90), Otago (1991–92), and Columbia (1995) Universities. At New York University, he teaches Rule of Law, Jurisprudence, seminars on Property and Human Dignity and regularly hosts the Colloquium on Legal, Social and Political Philosophy, founded by Ronald Dworkin and Thomas Nagel in 1987 and convened by Liam Murphy, Samuel Scheffler, and Waldron.

Waldron gave the second series of Seeley Lectures at Cambridge University in 1996, the 1999 Carlyle Lectures at Oxford, the spring 2000 University Lecture at Columbia Law School, the Wesson Lectures at Stanford University in 2004, the Storrs Lectures at Yale Law School in 2007, and the Gifford Lectures at the University of Edinburgh in 2015. He was elected to the American Academy of Arts and Sciences in 1998. In 2005, Waldron received an honorary doctorate from the University of Otago, his alma mater. Waldron was elected to the American Philosophical Society in 2015. In 2019, a Professorial Chair in Jurisprudence was created in his name at the University of Otago.

== Legal and philosophical views ==
Waldron is a liberal and a normative legal positivist. He has written extensively on the analysis and justification of private property and on the political and legal philosophy of John Locke. He is an opponent of judicial review of legislation, and of torture, both of which he believes to be in tension with democratic principles. He believes that hate speech should not be protected by the First Amendment. Waldron has also criticised analytic legal philosophy for its failure to engage with the questions addressed by political theory. His later work is devoted to providing a non-religious and non-Kantian concept of human dignity, based on a thought experiment of leveling up all human beings to the high rank of nobility or aristocracy, thus constituting a single rank or caste. He has been working on this topic since he gave the Tanner Lectures on the subject in 2009, published in 2012 as Dignity, Rank and Rights.

=== Criticism of judicial review ===
Sandrine Baume has identified Jeremy Waldron and Bruce Ackerman as leading critics of the "compatibility of judicial review with the very principles of democracy". Baume identified John Hart Ely alongside Dworkin as the foremost defenders of this principle in recent years, while the opposition to this principle of "compatibility" were identified as Bruce Ackerman and Waldron. In contrast to Waldron and Ackerman, Dworkin was a long-time advocate of a moral reading of the United States Constitution, whose lines of support he sees as strongly associated with enhanced versions of judicial review in the federal government. A staunch defender of the principle of democratic legislation, in an article titled "The Core of the Case against Judicial Review", Waldron argued for a limited role for judicial review in a robust democratic government. Waldron asserts that there is no inherent advantage to a judiciary's protection of rights than to a legislature's if (1) there is a broadly democratic political system with appropriate suffrage and process, (2) there is a system of courts somewhat insulated from popular pressure and engaged in judicial review, (3) there is a general commitment to rights, and (4) there is disagreement as to the content and extent of rights. Even so, Waldron does not argue against the existence of judicial review, which may be appropriate when there is institutional dysfunction. In this case, the defense of judicial review compatible with democracy is limited to remedies for that dysfunction and are neither unlimited nor universal. Waldron thus places his view of judicial review in the tradition of Justice Harlan Fiske Stone.

=== Affinity with judicial minimalism ===
In a review of a 2015 book by Cass Sunstein, Waldron stated that between the polarity represented by judges who can be "heroic" in the interpretation of their judgments and those who abstain, that his preference would be sympathetic to a position which could be described as "judicial minimalism". Waldron states his examples of such judges as including Sandra Day O'Connor, Ruth Ginsburg, and Felix Frankfurter.

== Personal life ==
Waldron's longtime partner is Columbia Law School professor Carol Sanger.

== Publications ==
Books

- 1984. Theories of Rights, edited vol. ISBN 0-19-875063-3
- 1988. The Right to Private Property. ISBN 0-19-823937-8, ISBN 0-19-824326-X
- 1988. Nonsense Upon Stilts: Bentham, Burke and Marx on the Rights of Man, edited vol. ISBN 0-416-91890-5
- 1990. The Law: Theory and Practice in British Politics. ISBN 0-415-01427-1
- 1993. Liberal Rights: Collected Papers 1981–91. ISBN 0-521-43617-6
- 1999. The Dignity of Legislation, Seeley Lectures. ISBN 0-521-65883-7, ISBN 85-336-1896-4 (Portuguese translation)
- 1999. Law and Disagreement. ISBN 0-19-924303-4
- 2002. God, Locke and Equality. ISBN 0-521-89057-8
- 2010. Torture, Terror, and Trade-Offs: Philosophy for the White House. ISBN 978-0-19-958504-5
- 2012. The Harm in Hate Speech, Oliver Wendell Holmes Lectures. ISBN 978-0674065895
- 2012. "Partly Laws Common To All Mankind": Foreign Law in American Courts. ISBN 978-0300148657
- 2012. The Rule of Law and the Measure of Property, Hamlyn Lectures. ISBN 978-1107653788
- 2012. Dignity, Rank and Rights (Meir Dan Cohen: editor), Oxford University Press. ISBN 978-0-19-991543-9
- 2016. Political Political Theory, Harvard University Press. ISBN 978-0-674-74385-4
- 2017. One Another's Equals: The Basis of Human Equality, Harvard University Press. ISBN 978-0674659766
- 2023. Thoughtfulness and the Rule of Law, Harvard University Press. ISBN 9780674290778

Articles

- 2001, "Normative (or Ethical) Positivism" in Jules Coleman (ed.), Hart's Postscript: Essays on the Postscript to The Concept of Law. New York: Oxford University Press. ISBN 0-19-829908-7
- 2003, "Who is my Neighbor?: Humanity and Proximity," The Monist 86.
- 2004, "Settlement, Return, and the Supersession Thesis," Theoretical Inquiries in Law 5.
- 2004, "Terrorism and the Uses of Terror," The Journal of Ethics, Vol. 8, No. 1, Terrorism (2004) pp. 5–35.
- 2005, "Torture and Positive Law: Jurisprudence for the White House," Columbia Law Review 105.
- 2006, "The Core of the Case Against Judicial Review," Yale Law Journal 115.
- 2009, "Dignity and Defamation: The Visibility of Hate" ". 2009 Oliver Wendell Holmes Lectures.
- 2012, "Bicameralism and the Separation of Powers," Current Legal Problems 31.
- 2021, "The rule of law and the role of courts," Global Constitutionalism 10.
- 2022, "Free Speech Apart from Law," Journal of Free Speech Law 107.
- 2023, "Philosophical Foundations of Migration Law," Public Affairs Quarterly 37.

Academic offices
Preceded by G. A. Cohen	Chichele Professor of Social and Political Theory; 2010–2014	Vacant Title next held by Amia Srinivasan
