= Luck egalitarianism =

Ethical and political position

Luck egalitarianism is a view about egalitarianism espoused by a variety of egalitarian and other political philosophers. According to this view, justice demands that variations in how well-off people are should be wholly determined by the responsible choices people make and not by differences in their unchosen circumstances. Luck egalitarianism expresses that it is a bad thing for some people to be worse off than others through no fault of their own.

== Origins ==
Theories of luck egalitarianism were foreshadowed by 20th-century philosopher John Rawls' theory of distributive justice, in which he observed that a person's skills and abilities led to differential distributive justice outcomes. Rawls argued that this is unfair, because one's natural talents or circumstances are morally arbitrary, as they have been determined by a "natural lottery" rather than one's own choices. This concern influenced later egalitarians' theories of justice, of which Ronald Dworkin's theory of equality of resources is considered to be the first with clearly luck egalitarian features, although he rejected the label himself. Following Dworkin, Richard Arneson's equality of opportunity for welfare theory and Gerald Cohen's equal access to advantage theory were two of the most prominent early luck egalitarian theories.

== Basic principles ==
Luck egalitarianism is based on the idea that arbitrary factors (such as accidents or illness) should not influence equality, and therefore people should be compensated for undeserved misfortune that impacts their interests. Luck egalitarianism is intended as a fundamental normative idea that might guide our thinking about justice rather than as an immediate policy prescription. The idea has its origin in John Rawls' thought that distributive shares should not be influenced by arbitrary factors. Luck egalitarians disagree among themselves about the proper way to measure how well off people are (for instance, whether we should measure material wealth, psychological happiness or some other factor) and the related issue of how to assess the value of their resources.

== Variant ==
Global luck egalitarianism is a view about distributive justice at the global level associated with cosmopolitan moral theory. It starts from the premise that it is a bad thing for some people to be worse off than others through no fault of their own and applies this intuition across borders. Global luck egalitarians characteristically believe that moral agents may have duties to mitigate the brute luck of distant others. Proponents of this school of thought are amongst others Simon Caney and arguably Charles Beitz; opponents, most of whom reject the above premise either in its entirety or with respect to inequalities in which one party's welfare is at least above some minimum level, include Robert Nozick.

== Criticism ==
One criticism is that correlation does not imply causation, with alternative possible explanations for the observed correlations possible in terms of structure, agency, luck and choice.

Elizabeth S. Anderson criticizes luck egalitarianism on the basis that when something is chosen does not necessarily make it acceptable. An example of this would be a robber offering someone the choice "Your money or your life", a choice which some theorists, including Thomas Hobbes (Leviathan XIV: "Covenants Extorted by Feare are Valide") have regarded as presumptively binding. She also claims that luck egalitarianism expresses a demeaning pity towards the disadvantaged, basing their claims to compensation not on equality but inferiority, and excludes many individuals from the social conditions of their freedom simply on the basis that it is judged to be their fault for losing them. Further, it involves the state making highly moralistic and intrusive judgements about the choices that individuals make, and seems to lead to very counter-intuitive conclusions: those who voluntarily enter jobs with higher-than-average risks or who "choose" to live in geographical locations prone to natural disasters may make no claim on others if they suffer as a result of it.

== Bibliography ==
- Allingham, Michael (2014). Distributive justice. New York: Routledge. pp. 53–55. ISBN 978-0-415-85911-0. OCLC 857966361.
- Anderson, Elizabeth S. (1999-01-01). "What Is the Point of Equality?". Ethics. 109 (2): 287–337. doi:10.1086/233897. JSTOR 10.1086/233897.
- Knight, Carl (2013). "Luck Egalitarianism" (PDF). Philosophy Compass. 8 (10): 924–934. doi:10.1111/phc3.12077.
- Parfit, Derek (1984). Reasons and Persons. Oxford: Oxford University Press. p. 26. ISBN 9780198249085.
- Rawls, John (1999). A Theory of Justice (Revised ed.). Cambridge, Massachusetts: Harvard University Press. pp. 63–64. ISBN 0-674-00077-3. OCLC 41266156.
