= Law as integrity =

Concept in philosophy of law by R. Dworkin

In philosophy of law, law as integrity is a theory of law put forward by Ronald Dworkin in his book Law's Empire. "Dworkin's model of adjudication ... requires a court to interpret all legal material as part of a seamless, self-consistent unity". Law has integrity, according to Dworkin, when it is viewed not as a series of isolated statutes and cases, but when it is seen, as far as possible, as a "single, coherent scheme of principle". We should assume, Dworkin writes, that law "serves some interest or purpose or enforces some principle — in short, that it has some point — that can be stated independently of just describing the rules that make up the practice".
