= Bjørn Erik Rasch =

Norwegian Academic

Academic background
- Education: University of Oslo

Academic work
- Discipline: political science
- Institutions: University of Oslo

Bjørn Erik Rasch (born 15 October 1953) is an alumnus of the University of Oslo (1982), where he has been a Professor since 1994. He was a researcher at the Norwegian Institute for Social Research 1990–94. He was formerly joint editor of Norsk Statsvitenskapelig Tidsskrift. He has been guest lecturer at the University of California San Diego (UCSD), Harvard University and Columbia University.

In 2012, he was elected to the Norwegian Academy of Science and Letters in the group for letters.

== Bibliography ==
- Bjørn Erik Rasch (ed.): Symbolpolitikk og parlamentarisk styring. Oslo: Universitetsforlaget, 1993.
- Bjørn Erik Rasch: "Positiv og normativ politisk analyse: Om det egenartede ved statsvitenskapelig analyse og utfordringen fra økonomiske teorier om politikk" in: Statsvetenskaplig Tidskrift (Lund) 1987: 3.
- Bjørn Erik Rasch, Demokrati – ideer og organisering. Bergen: Fagbokforlaget, 2000.
- Bjørn Erik Rasch, Janne Haaland Matlary and Per Kristen Mydske, ed. Spillet om Irak. Oslo: Abstrakt forlag, 2003.
- Bjørn Erik Rasch, Kampen om regjeringsmakten. Norsk parlamentarisme i europeisk perspektiv. Bergen: Fagbokforlaget, 2004.
- Knut Midgaard and Bjørn Erik Rasch, ed. Demokrati: vilkår og virkninger. Bergen: Fagbokforlaget, 2004.
- Bjørn Erik Rasch, ed. Islamistisk terrorisme. Oslo: Abstrakt forlag, 2005.
