= Nigel Simmonds =

English jurisprudence professor

Nigel Simmonds is an English legal scholar who is Emeritus Professor of Jurisprudence at the University of Cambridge and former Dean of College at Corpus Christi College, Cambridge.

== Career ==
Simmonds attended one of the first comprehensive schools in Britain in Cumberland before going to study law at Sidney Sussex College, Cambridge in 1970. He then studied for the LL.M where he once again attained a First Class. After a PhD and some years of teaching at Manchester University, he returned to Cambridge where he was a university professor in jurisprudence until his retirement in 2018. At Corpus, Nigel Simmonds was Director of Studies in Law and Dean of College. Nigel Simmonds specialises in Jurisprudence. He is the author of 'A Debate Over Rights' (Oxford, 2000), 'Central Issues in Jurisprudence' (2008) and 'Law as a Moral Idea' (2007).
