= Law's Empire =

1986 book by Ronald Dworkin

- Cover of the first edition
- Author: Ronald Dworkin
- Language: English
- Subject: Jurisprudence
- Publisher: Belknap Press
- Publication date: 1986
- Publication place: United States
- Media type: Print
- Pages: 470
- ISBN: 9780674518353 (1st ed)
- OCLC: 631282485

Law's Empire is a 1986 text in legal philosophy by Ronald Dworkin, in which the author continues his criticism of the philosophy of legal positivism as promoted by H. L. A. Hart during the middle to late 20th century. The book introduces the concept of "law as integrity". Dworkin creates Judge Hercules as an idealized version of a jurist with extraordinary legal skills who is able to challenge various predominating schools of legal interpretation and legal hermeneutics prominent throughout the 20th century. Judge Hercules is eventually challenged by Judge Hermes, another idealized version of a jurist who is affected by an affinity to respecting historical legal meaning arguments which do not affect Judge Hercules in the same manner. Judge Hermes' theory of legal interpretation is found by Dworkin in the end to be inferior to the approach of Judge Hercules.

== Background ==
Much of the twentieth century in legal philosophy has been characterized by the confrontation of legal positivism with natural law theory as being among the most prominent legal theories seen in the century. One major proponent of the Anglo-American version of legal positivism was H. L. A. Hart, a professor at Oxford University, who was a teacher of Dworkin's and with whom eventually Dworkin would come to strongly disagree. To challenge the prevailing schools of legal interpretation and legal philosophy in the late twentieth century, Dworkin invented the personage of Judge Hercules to represent a version of legal philosophy which he saw as effectively answering many of the shortcomings he had come to identify with Hart and other legal schools prominent in his time.

Dworkin's approach in the book is to present his argument in ten chapters with one summary chapter added at the end of the book titled, "Law Beyond Law". The book is original in its format compared to conventional approaches to academic studies in the law by introducing the personage of Judge Hercules early in the text to answer many of the legal theories which Dworkin wishes to discuss as to their being insufficient to meet the requirements of late 20th century jurisprudence. In Dworkin's perspective, the prevailing climate of legal theory at the end of the 20th century was understood by him as being represented by the deficiencies of many competing and contradictory legal theories being presented by the legal academy. The ten chapters of the book build their logical argument sequentially and in growing complexity of exposition where each chapter is dependent upon the logical demonstrations made in previous chapters in order to establish the rationale and comprehension at work in the mind of the legal personage represented by Judge Hercules.

== Summary ==
Dworkin concisely states his primary concern in the preface of this volume concerning his approach to the philosophy of law: "We are subjects of law's empire, liegemen to its methods and ideals, bound in spirit while we debate what we must therefore do." The "empire" of the law is expansive for Dworkin and includes not only the domain of jurisprudence but extends fully into the domain of politics and sociology, including the philosophical domain of morals, ethics and even aesthetics as these affect the lives of all individuals of society.

=== Chapter One: What is Law? ===
In this chapter, Dworkin tells his readers that there are three types of law with which he is primarily concerned. These three areas of law are outlined as (a) Conventionalism, (b) Pragmatism (semantic theory), and (c) Law as integrity. Dworkin shall make a primary point of defending Law as integrity throughout the subsequent chapters of his text.

=== Chapter Two: Interpretive Concepts ===
Dworkin introduced his principle of the "semantic sting" of the semantic philosophy of law. He develops and distinguishes between two forms of skepticism to present his arguments differentiating between "internal skepticism" and "external skepticism", for use in subsequent chapters.

=== Chapter Three: Jurisprudence Revisited ===
Dworkin informs his readers that the concept of law is the theory of what forms the ground of law. The "concept of law" was used by H. L. A. Hart as the title for an approach to law strongly oriented to Anglo-American reading of positive law to which Dworkin would find insufficient for dealing with issues of jurisprudence encountered throughout the 20th century.

=== Chapter Four: Conventionalism ===
In this chapter, Dworkin begins his three-part, three-tier assessment of law with his criticism of Conventionalism. He differentiated Conventionalism as falling into two different kinds, which are insufficient, in the end, to the needs of contemporary jurisprudence at the end of the 20th century leading to the start of the 21st century. Dworkin ends the chapter asserting the failure of Conventionalism.

=== Chapter Five: Pragmatism and Personification ===
Dworkin rejects pragmatism here as insufficient to the adjudication requirements and legislative principles that he sees as prevailing at the end of the twentieth century. Dworkin begins to stress that contemporary jurisprudence in his view needs to hold in high esteem the values of justice as integrity, fairness, and due process.

=== Chapter Six: Integrity ===
For Dworkin, "Justice is a matter of outcomes: a political decision causes injustice, however fair its procedures that produced it, when it denies people some resource, liberty, or opportunity that the best theories of justice entitle them to have." For Dworkin, the answerability of jurisprudence to political theory and political obligations is central. Political ideals are presented as operating from a base of moral concerns that influence what is legislated as law.
