= Conjuncture (international relations) =

Relations between countries can follow a curve. This curve can be shaped by the domestic conditions and policies of the countries and international conditions. An appropriate conjuncture may facilitate decision-making and action, while inappropriate international conditions may create great difficulties and even impede international action.

The word conjuncture is derived from the Italian "congiuntura". An extensive usage of the word is found in French as "conjoncture". The Dictionnaire des Dictionnaires defines it as "the meeting, by coincidence, of different things at the same place". The Dictionnaire Encyclopédique Quillet characterises it as a situation created as a result of some events or interests meeting at the same time and place". Kathleen Christison, in her book on Palestine, interprets this term as a "unique constellation of forces".

== Recent examples ==
The current international system is affected by the Second World War, the Cold War and the end of the Cold War. These are three major events shaping the international conjuncture today. Relations between countries take on a different shape when they are situated in the Cold War period or during the end of the Cold War. The countries in Europe have clearly shown us that they have been affected by the international conjuncture. The Reunification of Germany is certainly a result of the end of the Cold War. It could not have been achieved had the USSR not disintegrated. As of today, it can be said that a new international conjuncture was created as a result of the 9/11 attacks on the United States thereby leading to the invasion of Afghanistan and Iraq.
