= Richard W. Miller =

American academic (1945–2023)

Richard W. Miller (1945–2023) was the Wyn and William Y. Hutchinson Professor in Ethics and Public Life and Director of the Program on Ethics and Public Life in the Cornell University Department of Philosophy. He specialized in moral philosophy, political philosophy, and philosophy of science.

== Education and career ==
Miller received his Ph.D. from Harvard University in 1975. His dissertation, "Solipsism and Language in the Writings of Wittgenstein," was directed by Rogers Albritton and Hilary Putnam. He has spent his entire academic career at Cornell.

== Philosophical work ==
Miller is best known for his work in social and political philosophy, but also published widely in epistemology, philosophy of science, and ethics. He is the author of Marx and Aristotle, in Alex Callinicos's Marxist Theory series as well as of several books, including Globalizing Justice: The Ethics of Poverty and power. Moral Differences: Truth, Justice, and Conscience in a World of Conflict (Princeton, 1992), Fact and Method: Explanation, Confirmation, and Reality in the Natural and the Social Sciences (Princeton, 1987), and Analyzing Marx: Morality, Power, and History (Princeton, 1984).

== Book chapter ==
- Miller, Richard W. (2018). "Part I: Libertarianism and other Theories; Ch. 1: Learning from an Unrepentant Social Democrat". In Brennan, Jason; van der Vossen, Bas; Schmidtz, David (eds.). The Routledge Handbook of Libertarianism. London and New York: Taylor & Francis Group. pp. 3–21. ISBN 978-0367870591.

== See also ==
- American philosophy
- List of American philosophers
