= Simon Caney =

British political theorist (born 1966)

- Born: 1966 (age 59–60)

Academic background
- Education: Merton College, Oxford; Nuffield College, Oxford
- Academic advisor: G. A. Cohen

Academic work
- Discipline: Philosophy
- Sub-discipline: Political philosophy
- Institutions: Newcastle University; University of Birmingham; Magdalen College, Oxford; University of Warwick

Simon Caney (born 1966) is a British political theorist who is Professor of Political Theory at the University of Warwick and a member of the Nuffield Council on Bioethics.

Caney studied philosophy, politics, and economics at Merton College, Oxford, and was a postgraduate student of G. A. Cohen at Nuffield College, Oxford. He taught at the University of Newcastle, the University of Birmingham, and at Magdalen College, at the University of Oxford before taking up his position at Warwick as Professor of Political Theory.

Caney is the author of Justice Beyond Borders (Oxford University Press, 2005) and of many articles in politics and philosophy journals.

== Books ==
- Justice Beyond Borders: A Global Political Theory (Oxford: Oxford University Press, 2005).
