= Making Sense of Marx =

1985 book by Jon Elster

- Cover
- Author: Jon Elster
- Language: English
- Subject: Karl Marx
- Publisher: Cambridge University Press
- Publication date: 1985
- Publication place: United Kingdom
- Media type: Print (Hardcover and Paperback)
- Pages: 556
- ISBN: 978-0521297059

Making Sense of Marx is a 1985 book about Karl Marx by the social and political theorist Jon Elster, in which the author reevaluates Marx's ideas. The book has received a mixture of praise and criticism from commentators.

== Reception ==
Making Sense of Marx was praised as "sharp" and "hard-headed" by the political scientist David McLellan. The political philosopher Richard W. Miller called Elster's work "erudite".

Conversely, the Marxist economist Ernest Mandel gave the work a negative review, while the philosopher Jan Narveson wrote that the work was, "greeted with highly mixed feelings by those who had hoped the title meant that there was sense to be made" of Marx.

== Bibliography ==
Books

- Mandel, Ernest (1989). Ware, Robert; Nielsen, Kai (eds.). Analyzing Marxism: New Essays on Analytical Marxism. Calgary: The University of Calgary Press. ISBN 0-919491-14-6.
- McLellan, David (1995). Karl Marx: A Biography. London: Papermac. ISBN 0-333-63947-2.
- Miller, Richard W. (1999). Carver, Terrell (ed.). The Cambridge Companion to Marx. Cambridge: Cambridge University Press. ISBN 0-521-36694-1.
- Narveson, Jan (2001). The Libertarian Idea. Orchard Park, New York: Broadview Press. ISBN 1-55111-421-6.
