= G. A. Cohen =

Canadian philosopher (1941–2009)

G. A. Cohen FBA
- Cohen in 1986
- Born: Gerald Allan Cohen; 14 April 1941; Montreal, Quebec, Canada
- Died: 5 August 2009 (aged 68); Oxford, England
- Other name: Jerry Cohen
- Spouses: Margaret Pearce (m. 1965; div. 1996); Michèle Jacottet (m. 1999)
- Children: 3

Education
- Education: McGill University; New College, Oxford
- Academic advisor: Gilbert Ryle

Philosophical work
- Era: Contemporary philosophy
- Region: Western philosophy
- School: Analytical Marxism; left-libertarianism; egalitarianism
- Institutions: University College, London; All Souls College, Oxford
- Doctoral students: Cécile Fabre; Will Kymlicka; Michael Otsuka; Seana Shiffrin
- Notable students: Simon Caney; Jonathan Wolff
- Main interests: Political philosophy; ethics; philosophy of history; social theory
- Notable ideas: Distinction between a strict and lax interpretation of the difference principle; egalitarian ethos

Gerald Allan Cohen (/ˈkoʊən/ KOH-ən; 14 April 1941 – 5 August 2009) was a Canadian political philosopher who held the positions of Quain Professor of Jurisprudence, University College London and Chichele Professor of Social and Political Theory, All Souls College, Oxford. He was known for his work on Marxism, and later, egalitarianism and distributive justice in normative political philosophy.

== Background ==
Born into an ethnically Jewish but "militantly anti-religious" family in Montreal, Quebec, on 14 April 1941, Cohen was a "red diaper baby". His mother was a longtime Canadian Communist Party member; his father had similar political views but chose not to join. Cohen was educated at the Morris Winchevsky School, Strathcona Academy, and Outremont High School. He then attended McGill University, obtaining a BA in philosophy and political science, and the University of Oxford, where he studied under Gilbert Ryle (and was also taught by Isaiah Berlin) and obtained a BPhil in philosophy.

== Academic career ==
Cohen was assistant lecturer (1963–1964), lecturer (1964–1979), then reader (1979–1984) in the Department of Philosophy at University College London, before being appointed to the Chichele chair at Oxford in 1985. Several of his students, such as Christopher Bertram, Simon Caney, Alan Carter, Cécile Fabre, Will Kymlicka, John McMurtry, David Leopold, Michael Otsuka, Seana Shiffrin, and Jonathan Wolff went on to be important moral and political philosophers. Cohen retired from the Chichele chair in 2008. At the time of his death, he was a visiting Quain Professor of Jurisprudence at UCL Faculty of Laws.

Cohen was a proponent of analytical Marxism and a founding member of the September Group. His 1978 work Karl Marx's Theory of History: A Defence defends an interpretation of Karl Marx's historical materialism its critics often call technological determinism. In History, Labour, and Freedom and Self-Ownership, Freedom, and Equality, Cohen offers an extensive moral argument in favour of socialism, contrasting his views with those of John Rawls and Robert Nozick by articulating an extensive critique of the Lockean principle of self-ownership as well as the use of that principle to defend right as well as left-libertarianism. In If You're an Egalitarian, How Come You're So Rich? (which reprints his 1996 Gifford Lectures), Cohen addresses the question of what egalitarian political principles imply for the personal behaviour of those who hold them.

Who gets what out of a market transaction reflects, among other things, the relative power of the players. Jettisoning the labor theory of value, Cohen argues that the "structure of proletarian unfreedom" requires workers to work for some capitalist. Reconceptualizing the Marxian critique of capitalism in this way turns it into an argument about power and freedom rather than labor-power and value. It suggests that, for all Marx's conceptual and predictive failures, his intuition that some under capitalism lack a basic freedom that others enjoy at their expense merits our continuing attention. But for this, it is important to solve various conceptual problems.

Cohen was known for his flamboyant style during philosophical debates. According to his best friend, the philosopher Gerald Dworkin, "Nothing was too inappropriate, private, bizarre, or embarrassing to be suddenly brought into the conversation".

== Personal life and death ==
In 1965, Cohen married Margaret Pearce; they had three children and divorced in 1996. Three years later, he married Michèle Jacottet. He personally abjured technology, a stance he called "technological conservatism"; Michèle answered all his emails.

Cohen was close friends with Marxist political philosopher Marshall Berman.

On 5 August 2009, Cohen died from a stroke at John Radcliffe Hospital in Oxford, aged 68.

== Select works ==
- Karl Marx's Theory of History: A Defence (1978, 2000). Princeton, NJ and Oxford: Princeton University Press and Oxford University Press.
- "The Labor Theory of Value and the Concept of Exploitation". Philosophy & Public Affairs. 8 (4): 338–360. 1979. Archived from the original on 19 April 2023. Included in History, Labour, and Freedom (1988), pp. 209–238.
- "The Structure of Proletarian Unfreedom" (PDF). Philosophy & Public Affairs. 12 (1): 3–33. Winter 1983. Archived (PDF) from the original on 14 June 2025. Included in History, Labour, and Freedom (1988), pp. 255–285.
- "Marx and Locke on Land and Labour" Proceedings of the British Academy 71, 1985 (1986)
- History, Labour, and Freedom (1988). Oxford: Oxford University Press.
- "Incentives, Inequality, and Community" The Tanner Lectures On Human Values, Delivered at Stanford University May 21, 23, 1991
- Self-Ownership, Freedom, and Equality. Cambridge: Cambridge University Press. 1995. ISBN 978-0-5214-7174-9. OCLC 612482692.
- "Freedom and Money" (PDF). Revista Argentina de Teoría Jurídica. 1 (1): 1–32. 2000. Archived (PDF) from the original on 14 January 2025.(orig. presented as Isaiah Berlin Memorial Lecture, May 1998).
- "If You're an Egalitarian, How Come You're So Rich?". The Journal of Ethics. 4 (1/2): 1–26. January–March 2000. JSTOR 25115633. This journal article is included as a chapter in Cohen's 2001 book, If You're an Egalitarian, How Come You're So Rich?
- If You're an Egalitarian, How Come You're So Rich? (2001). A collection of nine lectures Cohen gave at the University of Edinburgh in 1996.
- "Expensive Taste Rides Again," in: Ronald Dworkin and his Critics, with replies by Dworkin (2004)
- Rescuing Justice and Equality (2008)
- Why Not Socialism? (2009)
- On the Currency of Egalitarian Justice, and Other Essays in Political Philosophy (2011)
- Finding Oneself in the Other (2012)
- Lectures on the History of Moral and Political Philosophy (2014)

== See also ==
- Luck egalitarianism

Academic offices
Preceded by Charles Taylor	Chichele Professor of Social and Political Theory; 1985–2008	Succeeded by Jeremy Waldron
Preceded by János Kornai	Tanner Lecturer on Human Values at Stanford University; 1990–1991	Succeeded by Charles Taylor
Preceded by	Gifford Lecturer at the University of Edinburgh; 1995–1996	Succeeded by Richard Sorabji
Preceded by Ross Harrison	Quain Professor of Jurisprudence; 2008–2009	Succeeded by John Tasioulas
Awards
Preceded by Rudolf Bahro	Deutscher Memorial Prize; 1979	Succeeded by Bob Rowthorn
