= Richard Arneson =

American philosopher

Richard J. Arneson (/ˈɑːrnɪsən/; born 1945) is an American philosopher specializing in political philosophy who has taught at the University of California, San Diego since 1973. He chaired the department during 1992–1996 and served as graduate adviser. In 1996, he also served as visiting professor in the ethics, politics, and economics program at Yale University. Arneson earned his PhD in philosophy from the University of California, Berkeley, in 1975. His work has largely focused on utilitarianism and on luck egalitarianism. He is also a proponent of prioritarianism.

Arneson has also critiqued Marxism, arguing that capitalism was exploitative for more complex reasons than the labour theory of value accounted for. He argued that surplus transfer was only wrong when it was the result of an unequal distribution of social goods. Therefore, under capitalism, the majority of exchanges are inherently exploitative because the benefits end up in the hands of those who do not need it. Nonetheless, he says, surplus transfer is legitimate when it arises independently or when it is used to compensate the unequal distribution of natural endowments and wealth. Arneson has also contributed to debates concerning obligations from involuntary benefits, arguing that in some instances the "voluntary acceptance" condition ought to be relaxed.

== Book chapter ==
- Arneson, Richard (2018). "Part I: Libertarianism and other Theories; Ch. 4: Democracy Verses Libertarianism". In Brennan, Jason; van der Vossen, Bas; Schmidtz, David (eds.). The Routledge Handbook of Libertarianism. London and New York: Taylor & Francis Group. pp. 53–67. ISBN 978-0367870591.

== See also ==
- American philosophy
- List of American philosophers
