= Karl Marx's Theory of History =

1978 book by G. A. Cohen

Karl Marx's Theory of History: A Defence
- Cover of the first edition
- Author: G. A. Cohen
- Language: English
- Subject: Marx's theory of history
- Publisher: Princeton University Press
- Publication date: 1978
- Publication place: United States
- Media type: Print (hardcover and paperback)
- Pages: 369
- ISBN: 978-0-691-07175-6

Karl Marx's Theory of History: A Defence is a 1978 book by the philosopher G. A. Cohen, the culmination of his attempts to reformulate Karl Marx's theory of alienation, exploitation, and historical materialism. Cohen, who interprets Marxism as a scientific theory of history, applies the techniques of analytic philosophy to the elucidation and defence of Marx's materialist conception of history.

The work for which Cohen is best known, Karl Marx's Theory of History helped to establish analytical Marxism and was awarded the Isaac Deutscher memorial prize. Cohen's interpretation of Marx runs counter to most forms of twentieth-century Marxism, and has been criticised as a form of technological determinism.

== Summary ==
Cohen maintains that the technological determinism of Marx's summary of his science of history in the preface to A Contribution to the Critique of Political Economy defines his real views on the subject, a view with which other scholars have disagreed. He defends technological determinism by arguing for two theses, which he calls the "development thesis" and the "primacy thesis." The development thesis rests upon three presuppositions: that human beings are "somewhat rational", that their historical situation is one of scarcity, and that they "possess intelligence of a kind and degree which enables them to improve their situation." The existence of scarcity ensures a struggle for survival, the existence of intelligence ensures that scarcity-reducing innovations will occur, and the existence of rationality ensures that there will be a tendency to adopt them. Cohen seeks to establish the primacy thesis by arguing that different relations of production have differential capabilities for generating growth in the productive forces at different stages of development.

Cohen proposes that explanation in Marx’s theory is functional, by which he means roughly that the character of what is explained is determined by its effect on what explains it, so that "production relations profoundly affect productive forces, and superstructures strongly condition foundations." Functional explanation provides a way of recognizing the vital influence of the legal-political superstructure on the economic structure, while still assigning explanatory primacy to the latter. Thus the superstructure stabilizes its economic base, but in the other direction the economic relations determine the character of the superstructure, so that in this sense the economic base is primary and the superstructure secondary. It is precisely because the superstructure strongly affects the base that the base selects that superstructure. The relation between forces and relations of production is also explained functionally: the level of development of society’s productive forces (i.e., society’s technological powers, including tools, machinery, raw materials, and labour power) determines society’s economic structure, in the sense that it selects a structure of economic relations that tends best to facilitate further technological growth. As Charles Taylor puts it, "These two directions of influence are so far from being rivals that they are actually complementary. The functional explanation requires that the secondary factor tend to have a causal effect on the primary, for this dispositional fact is the key feature of the explanation."

== Influence and scholarly evaluation ==
Karl Marx's Theory of History: A Defence helped establish analytical Marxism as a school of thought, and came to be seen as a classic. The book was praised by the historian G. E. M. de Ste. Croix, and was also commended by the political scientist David McLellan. According to the philosopher Peter Singer, Cohen, in contrast to some more Hegelian interpretations of Marx's thought, "argues brilliantly for a more old-fashioned interpretation of Marxism as a scientific theory of history, an interpretation often known – disparagingly – as 'technological determinism'."

The political theorist Norman Geras described Karl Marx's Theory of History as the leading philosophical discussion of the way in which the character of human beings in any setting depends upon the nature of the prevailing social relations. The philosopher Roger Scruton, though finding Cohen's attempt to present historical materialism as a scientific hypothesis impressive, states that it shows how difficult it is to develop the necessary concepts. M. C. Howard and J. E. King note that Cohen's ideas have played no role in the debate on underdevelopment. They find this surprising, given their relevance to it. They believe that Cohen's analysis is of higher quality than that of the main protagonists in the debate, reinforcing their critical view of the work of Paul Baran, Andre Gunder Frank, and Immanuel Wallerstein.

The critic Terry Eagleton, who understands Cohen to be espousing a determinist theory in which productive forces automatically produce certain social relations, finds Karl Marx's Theory of History: A Defence to be a skillful defense of a "wrongheaded" idea.

Nicolas Vrousalis summarizes the criticisms against Cohen's determinism, and concludes that technological materialism requires a sharp distinction between material and social properties, which Cohen's theory does not provide. The productive forces therefore cannot be distinguished from the relations of production in the way that technological determinism requires.

== See also ==
- Karl Marx: His Life and Environment
