= Ronald Dworkin =

American legal philosopher (1931–2013)

Ronald Dworkin FBA QC
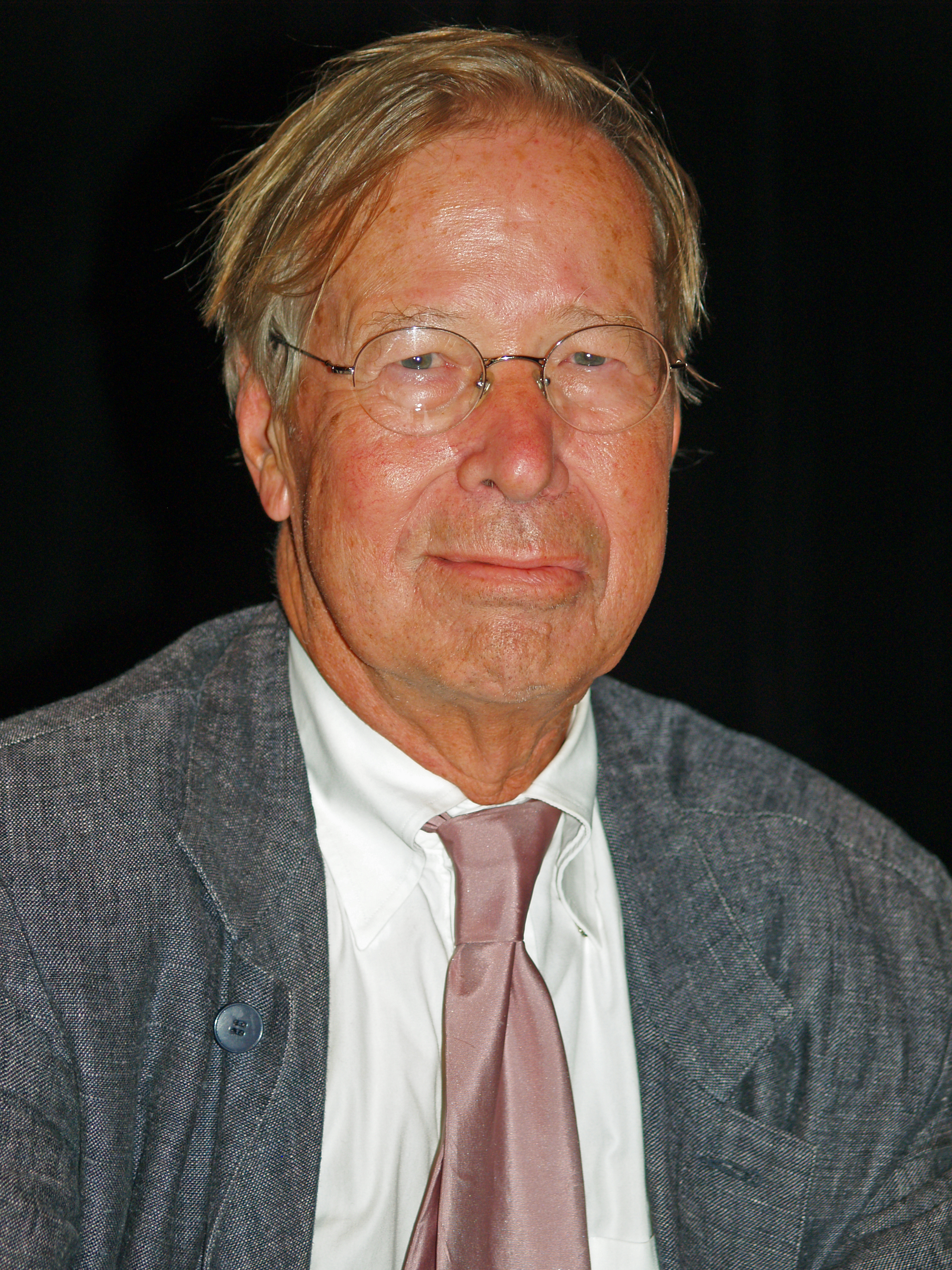
- Dworkin in 2008
- Born: Ronald Myles Dworkin; December 11, 1931; Worcester, Massachusetts, U.S.
- Died: February 14, 2013 (aged 81); London, England
- Awards: Henry J. Friendly Medal (2005); Holberg International Memorial Prize (2007); Balzan Prize (2012)

Education
- Education: Harvard University (AB, JD); Magdalen College, Oxford (BA)

Philosophical work
- Era: Contemporary philosophy
- Region: Western philosophy
- School: Analytic; Legal interpretivism
- Institutions: Yale University; University of Oxford; University College London; New York University
- Doctoral students: Jeremy Waldron
- Main interests: Jurisprudence; political philosophy
- Notable ideas: Law as integrity; fit and justification in law; right answer thesis; legal interpretivism; rights as trumps

Ronald Myles Dworkin (/ˈdwɔːrkɪn/; December 11, 1931 – February 14, 2013) was an American legal philosopher, jurist, and scholar of United States constitutional law. At the time of his death, he was Frank Henry Sommer Professor of Law and Philosophy at New York University and Professor of Jurisprudence at University College London. Dworkin had taught previously at Yale Law School and the University of Oxford, where he was the Professor of Jurisprudence, successor to philosopher H. L. A. Hart.

An influential contributor to both philosophy of law and political philosophy, Dworkin received the 2007 Holberg International Memorial Prize in the Humanities for "his pioneering scholarly work" of "worldwide impact". According to a survey in The Journal of Legal Studies, Dworkin was the second most-cited American legal scholar of the twentieth century. After his death, Harvard legal scholar Cass Sunstein said Dworkin was "one of the most important legal philosophers of the last 100 years. He may well head the list."

His theory of law as integrity as presented in his book Law's Empire, in which judges interpret the law in terms of consistent moral principles, especially justice and fairness, is among the most influential contemporary theories about the nature of law. Dworkin advocated a "moral reading" of the United States Constitution and an interpretivist approach to law and morality. He was a frequent commentator on contemporary political and legal issues, particularly those concerning the Supreme Court of the United States, often in The New York Review of Books.

== Early life and education ==
Ronald Dworkin was born in 1931 in Worcester, Massachusetts, the son of Madeline Taber and David Dworkin. He was schooled and grew up in Providence, Rhode Island. His family is Jewish. He graduated from Harvard University in 1953 with an A.B., summa cum laude, where he majored in philosophy and was elected to Phi Beta Kappa in his junior year. He then attended Magdalen College, Oxford as a Rhodes Scholar, where he was a student of Sir Rupert Cross and J. H. C. Morris. Upon completion of his final exams at Oxford, the examiners were so impressed with his script that the Professor of Jurisprudence (then H. L. A. Hart) was summoned to read it. He was awarded a B.A. with a congratulatory first. Dworkin then attended Harvard Law School, graduating in 1957 with a Juris Doctor, magna cum laude.

== Career ==
After law school, Dworkin was a law clerk to Judge Learned Hand of the United States Court of Appeals for the Second Circuit from 1957 to 1958. Hand would later call Dworkin "the law clerk to beat all law clerks", and Dworkin would recall Judge Hand as an enormously influential mentor. While clerking for Hand, Dworkin was offered a clerkship with Justice Felix Frankfurter of the U.S. Supreme Court. Dworkin declined the offer, a decision he later called "a very serious mistake." He instead joined Sullivan & Cromwell, a New York City law firm, as an associate.

In 1962, Dworkin left Sullivan & Cromwell and became a professor of law at Yale Law School, becoming the holder of the Wesley N. Hohfeld Chair of Jurisprudence. In 1969, he was appointed to the Chair of Jurisprudence at Oxford, a position in which he succeeded H. L. A. Hart (who remembered Dworkin's Oxford examination and promoted his candidacy) and was elected Fellow of University College, Oxford. After retiring from Oxford, Dworkin became the Quain Professor of Jurisprudence at University College London, where he later became the Bentham Professor of Jurisprudence. He was Frank Henry Sommer Professor of Law at New York University School of Law and professor of philosophy at New York University (NYU), where he taught from the late 1970s. He co-taught a colloquium in legal, political, and social philosophy with Thomas Nagel. Dworkin had regularly contributed, for several decades, to The New York Review of Books. He delivered the Oliver Wendell Holmes Lecture at Harvard, the Storrs Lectures at Yale, the Tanner Lectures on Human Values at Stanford, and the Scribner Lectures at Princeton. In June 2011, he joined the professoriate of New College of the Humanities, a private college in London.

== Jurisprudence and philosophy ==
=== Law as rule and principle ===
Dworkin's criticism of H. L. A. Hart's legal positivism has been summarized by the Stanford Encyclopedia of Philosophy:

Dworkin, as positivism's most significant critic, rejects the positivist theory on every conceivable level. Dworkin denies that there can be any general theory of the existence and content of law; he denies that local theories of particular legal systems can identify law without recourse to its moral merits, and he rejects the whole institutional focus of positivism. A theory of law is for Dworkin a theory of how cases ought to be decided and it begins, not with an account of the political organization of a legal system, but with an abstract ideal regulating the conditions under which governments may use coercive force over their subjects.

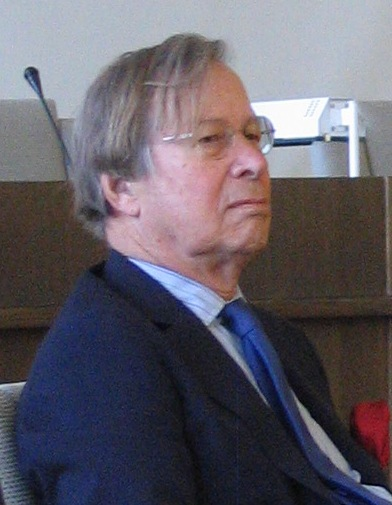
Dworkin in 2008

Dworkin's opinion of Hart's legal positivism was expressed in its fullest form in the book Law's Empire. Dworkin's theory is "interpretive": the law is whatever follows from a constructive interpretation of the institutional history of the legal system. Law should be viewed not as a series of isolated statutes and cases, but as a "single coherent scheme of principle".

Dworkin argues that moral principles that people hold dear are often wrong, even to the extent that certain crimes are acceptable if one's principles are skewed enough. To discover and apply these principles, courts interpret the legal data (legislation, cases, etc.) with a view to articulating an interpretation that best explains and justifies past legal practice. All interpretation must follow, Dworkin argues, from the notion of "law as integrity" to make sense.

Out of the idea that law is "interpretive" in this way, Dworkin argues that in every situation where people's legal rights are controversial, the best interpretation involves the right answer thesis, the thesis that there exists a right answer as a matter of law that the judge must discover. Dworkin opposes the notion that judges have discretion in such difficult cases.

Dworkin's model of legal principles is also connected with Hart's notion of the Rule of Recognition. Dworkin rejects Hart's conception of a master rule in every legal system that identifies valid laws, on the basis that this would entail that the process of identifying law must be uncontroversial, whereas (Dworkin argues) people have legal rights even in cases where the correct legal outcome is open to reasonable dispute.

Dworkin moves away from positivism's separation of law and morality, since constructive interpretation implicates moral judgments in every decision about what the law is.

Despite their intellectual disagreements, Hart and Dworkin "remained on good terms."

=== The right answer thesis ===
In Dworkin's own words, his "right answer thesis" may be interpreted through the following hypothetical:

Suppose the legislature has passed a statute stipulating that "sacrilegious contracts shall henceforth be invalid." The community is divided as to whether a contract signed on Sunday is, for that reason alone, sacrilegious. It is known that very few of the legislators had that question in mind when they voted, and that they are now equally divided on the question of whether it should be so interpreted. Tom and Tim have signed a contract on Sunday, and Tom now sues Tim to enforce the terms of the contract, whose validity Tim contests. Shall we say that the judge must look for the right answer to the question of whether Tom's contract is valid, even though the community is deeply divided about what the right answer is? Or is it more realistic to say that there simply is no right answer to the question?

One of Dworkin's most interesting and controversial theses states that the law as properly interpreted will give an answer. This is not to say that everyone will have the same answer (a consensus of what is "right"), or if it did, the answer would not be justified exactly in the same way for every person; rather it means that there will be a necessary answer for each individual if he applies himself correctly to the legal question. For the correct method is that encapsulated by the metaphor of Judge Hercules, an ideal judge, immensely wise and with full knowledge of legal sources. Hercules (the name comes from a classical mythological hero) would also have plenty of time to decide. Acting on the premise that the law is a seamless web, Hercules is required to construct the theory that best fits and justifies the law as a whole (law as integrity) in order to decide any particular case. Hercules is the perfect judge, but that doesn't mean he always reaches the right answer.

Dworkin does not deny that competent lawyers often disagree on what is the solution to a given case. On the contrary, he claims that they are disagreeing about the right answer to the case, the answer Hercules would give.

Dworkin's critics argue not only that law proper (that is, the legal sources in a positivist sense) is full of gaps and inconsistencies, but also that other legal standards (including principles) may be insufficient to solve a hard case. Some of them are incommensurable. In any of these situations, even Hercules would be in a dilemma and none of the possible answers would be the right one.

=== Discussion of the right answer thesis ===
Dworkin's metaphor of judge Hercules bears some resemblance to Rawls' veil of ignorance and Habermas' ideal speech situation, in that they all suggest idealized methods of arriving at somehow valid normative propositions. The key difference with respect to the former is that Rawls' veil of ignorance translates almost seamlessly from the purely ideal to the practical. In relation to politics in a democratic society, for example, it is a way of saying that those in power should treat the political opposition consistently with how they would like to be treated when in opposition, because their present position offers no guarantee as to what their position will be in the political landscape of the future (i.e. they will inevitably form the opposition at some point). Dworkin's Judge Hercules, on the other hand, is a purely idealized construct, that is, if such a figure existed, he would arrive at a right answer in every legal-moral dilemma. For a critique along these lines see Lorenzo Zucca's Constitutional Dilemmas.

Dworkin's right answer thesis turns on the success of his attack on the skeptical argument that right answers in legal-moral dilemmas cannot be determined. Dworkin's anti-skeptical argument is essentially that the properties of the skeptic's claim are analogous to those of substantive moral claims, that is, in asserting that the truth or falsity of legal-moral dilemmas cannot be determined, the skeptic makes not a metaphysical claim about the way things are, but a moral claim to the effect that it is, in the face of epistemic uncertainty, unjust to determine legal-moral issues to the detriment of any given individual.

=== Moral reading of the Constitution ===
Dworkin has been a long-time advocate of the principle of the moral reading of the Constitution whose lines of support he sees as strongly associated with enhanced versions of judicial review in the federal government.

=== Theory of equality ===
Dworkin has also made important contributions to what is sometimes called the equality of what debate. In a pair of articles and his book Sovereign Virtue, he advocates a theory he calls "equality of resources". This theory combines two key ideas. Broadly speaking, the first is that human beings are responsible for the life choices they make. The second is that natural endowments of intelligence and talent are morally arbitrary and ought not to affect the distribution of resources in society. Like the rest of Dworkin's work, his theory of equality is underpinned by the core principle that every person is entitled to equal concern and respect in the design of the structure of society. Dworkin's theory of equality is said to be one variety of so-called luck egalitarianism, but he rejects this statement.

=== Positive and negative liberty ===
In the essay "Do Values Conflict? A Hedgehog's Approach," Dworkin contends that the values of liberty and equality do not necessarily conflict. He criticizes Isaiah Berlin's conception of liberty as "flat" and proposes a new, "dynamic" conception of liberty, suggesting that one cannot say that one's liberty is infringed when one is prevented from committing murder. Thus, liberty cannot be said to have been infringed when no wrong has been done. Put in this way, liberty is only liberty to do whatever we wish so long as we do not infringe upon the rights of others.

== Personal life and death ==
While working for Judge Learned Hand, Dworkin met his future wife, Betsy Ross, with whom he would have twins Anthony and Jennifer. Betsy was the daughter of a successful New York businessman. They were married from 1958 until Betsy died of cancer in 2000. Dworkin later in 2011 was reported as spending time with Irene Brendel, who was married to pianist Alfred Brendel. Dworkin and Brendel later married.

Dworkin died of leukemia in London on February 14, 2013, at the age of 81, survived by his second wife, two children, and two grandchildren.

== Awards ==
In 2005, Dworkin was jointly awarded the American Law Institute's Henry J. Friendly Medal with Judge Richard Posner. In September 2007, Dworkin was awarded the Holberg International Memorial Prize. The award citation of the Holberg Prize Academic Committee recognized that Dworkin has "elaborated a liberal egalitarian theory" and stressed Dworkin's effort to develop "an original and highly influential legal theory grounding law in morality, characterized by a unique ability to tie together abstract philosophical ideas and arguments with concrete everyday concerns in law, morals, and politics".

The New York University Annual Survey of American Law honored Dworkin with its 2006 dedication.

In 2006, the Legal Research Institute of the National Autonomous University of Mexico honored Dworkin with the Héctor Fix-Zamudio International Award.

In June 2000, he was awarded an honorary doctorate by the University of Pennsylvania. In June 2009, he was awarded an honorary doctorate of law by Harvard University. In August 2011, the University of Buenos Aires awarded Dworkin an honorary doctorate. The resolution noted that he "has tirelessly defended the rule of law, democracy and human rights." These were among a number of honorary doctorates conferred upon him.

On November 14, 2012, Dworkin received the Balzan Prize for Jurisprudence in Quirinale Palace, Rome, from the President of the Italian Republic. The Balzan Prize was awarded "for his fundamental contributions to Jurisprudence, characterized by outstanding originality and clarity of thought in a continuing and fruitful interaction with ethical and political theories and with legal practices".

He was an honorary Queen's Counsel (QC).

Dworkin was elected a fellow of the British Academy, the American Academy of Arts and Sciences, and the American Philosophical Society.

== Legacy and influence ==
Dworkin influenced multiple philosophers from various fields. His work has been used as reference by the Argentinian Supreme Court. US Supreme Court justice Stephen Breyer said in an obituary that Dworkin was an influential voice, reminding judges that law wasn't just technical work but derived from democratic values. American legal philosopher Jules Coleman cited Dworkin as a major influence. Dworkin's theory of equality influenced Karel Martens's transport justice theory, through Marten's adaptation of Dworkin's hypothetical insurance policy to argue for collective support to ensure that people have sufficient accessibility.

== Selected works ==
=== Books ===
Author

- Taking Rights Seriously. Cambridge, Massachusetts: Harvard University Press, 1977.
- A Matter of Principle. Cambridge, Massachusetts: Harvard University Press, 1985.
- Law's Empire. Cambridge, Massachusetts: Harvard University Press, 1986.
- "Philosophical issues concerning the rights of patients suffering serious permanent dementia", prepared for the Office of Technology Assessment, Congress of the United States (Washington, DC: Government Printing Office, 1987)
- A Bill of Rights for Britain. Ann Arbor, Michigan: University of Michigan Press, 1990.
- Life's Dominion: An Argument About Abortion, Euthanasia, and Individual Freedom. New York: Alfred A. Knopf, 1993.
- Freedom's Law: The Moral Reading of the American Constitution. Cambridge, Massachusetts: Harvard University Press, 1996.
- Sovereign Virtue: The Theory and Practice of Equality. Cambridge, Massachusetts: Harvard University Press, 2000.
- Justice in Robes. Cambridge, Massachusetts: Harvard University Press, 2006.
- Is Democracy Possible Here? Principles for a New Political Debate. Princeton, New Jersey: Princeton University Press, 2006..
- Justice for Hedgehogs. Cambridge, Massachusetts: Harvard University Press, 2011.
- Religion Without God. Cambridge, Massachusetts: Harvard University Press, 2013.

Editor

- The Philosophy of Law (Oxford Readings in Philosophy). New York: Oxford University Press, 1977.
- A Badly Flawed Election: Debating Bush v. Gore, the Supreme Court, and American Democracy. New York: New Press, 2002.
- From Liberal Values to Democratic Transition: Essays in Honor of Janos Kis. Budapest: Central European University Press, 2004.

=== Articles ===
- Dworkin, Ronald M. (1966). "Lord Devlin and the Enforcement of Morals". Yale Law Journal. 75 (6): 986–1006.
- — (1967). "The Model of Rules". University of Chicago Law Review. 35 (1): 14–46.
- — (1975). "Hard Cases". Harvard Law Review. 88 (6): 1057–1109. JSTOR 1340249.
- — (1978). "No Right Answer?". New York University Law Review. 53 (1): 1–32.
- — (1980). "Why Efficiency? A Response to Professors Calabresi and Posner". Hofstra Law Review. 8 (3): 563–90.
- — (1980). "Is Wealth a Value?". Journal of Legal Studies. 9 (2): 191–226. doi:10.1086/467636.
- — (1981). "The Forum of Principle". New York University Law Review. 56 (2/3): 469–518.
- — (1982). "Law As Interpretation". Texas Law Review. 60 (3): 527–50. JSTOR 1343279.
- — (1982). "Natural Law Revisited". Florida Law Review. 34 (2): 165–88.
- — (1989). "Liberal Community". California Law Review. 77 (3): 479–504. doi:10.15779/Z38J721.
- — (1992). "Unenumerated Rights: Whether and How Roe Should Be Overruled". University of Chicago Law Review. 59 (1): 381–432. JSTOR 1599941.
- — (1997). "The Arduous Virtue of Fidelity: Originalism, Scalia, Tribe, and Nerve". Fordham Law Review. 65 (4): 1249–68.

For a more complete listing of publications see Burley (2004).

== See also ==
- Hart–Dworkin debate
- Legal indeterminacy
- Judicial activism
- Legal formalism
