= The Inclusion of the Other =

1996 book by Jürgen Habermas

- Cover of the German edition
- Author: Jürgen Habermas
- Original title: Die Einbeziehung des Anderen. Studien zur politischen Theorie
- Translator: Jeremy J. Shapiro
- Language: German
- Subject: Democracy
- Published: 1996 (in German); 1998 (in English)
- Publication place: Germany
- Media type: Print

The Inclusion of the Other (German: Die Einbeziehung des Anderen. Studien zur politischen Theorie) is 1996 book by the German philosopher Jürgen Habermas.

== Summary ==
The Inclusion of the Other is a collection of essays, in which Habermas expands on the ideas on law and democracy first articulated in his Between Facts and Norms (1992). Topics include the future of the nation-state, human rights, and deliberative democracy. Also included are two essays Habermas wrote in a series with American political philosopher John Rawls on public reason and the overlapping consensus. Rawls's response is included both with his Collected Papers and the current edition of Political Liberalism (1993).
