= Marriage privatization =

Concept about personal relationships

Marriage privatization is the concept that the state should have no authority to define the terms of personal relationships such as marriage. Proponents of marriage privatization, including certain minarchists, anarchists, libertarians, and opponents of government interventionism, claim that such relationships are best defined by private individuals and not the state. Arguments for the privatization of marriage have been offered by a number of scholars and writers. Proponents of marriage privatization often argue that privatizing marriage is a solution to the social controversy over same-sex marriage. Arguments for and against the privatization of marriage span both liberal and conservative political camps.

== Advocacy ==
=== Libertarian advocacy ===
In 1997, libertarian David Boaz wrote an article for Slate titled “Privatize Marriage: A Simple Solution to the Gay-Marriage Debate". In the article, Boaz suggests privatizing marriage in a way that models the nature of standard business contracts. Boaz's idea is to allow two (possibly more) individuals to set the terms of their own private marital contract in a way that is best for the individuals involved. "When children or large sums of money are involved, an enforceable contract spelling out the parties' respective rights and obligations is probably advisable. But the existence and details of such an agreement should be up to the parties." According to Boaz the government could be called upon to enforce the contract but may have no other role in developing the contract and setting the terms.

In 2002, Wendy McElroy echoed Boaz's business contract model in an essay for Ifeminists titled "It's Time to Privatize Marriage."

Marriage should be privatized. Let people make their own marriage contracts according to their conscience, religion and common sense. Those contracts could be registered with the state, recognized as legal and arbitrated by the courts, but the terms would be determined by those involved.

McElroy has also said:

Why is marriage declining? One reason is that it has become a three-way contract between two people and the government.

In 2003, political columnist Ryan McMaken, writing on LewRockwell.com, raised the issue of marriage privatization arguing that the rise of state-sanctioned marriage coincides historically with the expansion of government. In his article titled "Married to the State," McMaken wrote:

The question we are then left with today is one of whether the churches and individuals should be looking to privatize marriage yet again and to begin making a distinction between secular contracts between private citizens and religious unions that should be kept beyond the power of the State. Such a move, of course, would bring with it new assumptions about the role of the State in divorce, children, and a variety of other aspects of family life. The State will not give up control over these things easily, for the assertion that the importance of marriage makes it a legitimate interest of the State is only true from the point of view of the State itself, for as the foundation of society, marriage and family cannot be entrusted to governments just to be blown about by the winds of democratic opinion, for the same government that has the power to protect can just as easily destroy.

In a similar libertarian vein, the radio talk-show host Larry Elder endorsed the privatization of marriage. In "The State Should Get Out of the Marriage Business", a 2004 article published on the website Capitalism Magazine, Elder wrote:

How about government simply getting out of the marriage-license-granting business? (Ditto for government licenses necessary to cut hair, drive a taxi, open a business or enter a profession.) Leave marriage to non-governmental institutions, like churches, synagogues, mosques, and other houses of worship or private institutions. Adultery, although legal, remains a sin subject to societal condemnation. It's tough to legislate away condemnation or legislate in approval. Those who view same-sex marriage as sinful will continue to do so, no matter what the government, the courts or their neighbors say.

In 2006, law professor Colin P.A. Jones wrote an article appearing in the San Francisco Chronicle titled "Marriage Proposal: Why Not Privatize?" following the business model for privatization Jones writes:

Subject to certain statutory constraints, businesspeople have long been free to form whatever sort of partnership they felt appropriate to their needs. Why not make the same possible for marriage, which is a partnership based on one of the oldest types of contractual relationships?

In 2009, author and journalist Naomi Wolf wrote about getting the state out of marriage in The Sunday Times:

Let's also get the state out of the marriage union. In spite of the dress and the flowers, marriage is a business contract. Women, generally, don't understand this, until it hits them over the head upon divorce. Let's take a lead from our gay and lesbian friends, who, without state marriage, often create domestic partnerships with financial autonomy and unity spelt out. A heterosexual parallel: celebrate marriage with a religious or emotional ceremony—leave the state out of it—and create a business- or domestic-partner contract aligning the couple legally.

Professor Gary Becker, a winner of the Nobel Memorial Prize in Economic Sciences, has said that:

With marriage contracts that set out the couple's commitments, there is little reason why judges should retain their current involvement in marriage.

As of 2015, the only known members of US Congress to support privatization of state marriage are Sen. Rand Paul, Rep. Justin Amash (I–Michigan) and Rep. Gary Palmer (R–Alabama).

=== Religious advocacy ===
Pepperdine University law professor Douglas Kmiec told the Catholic News Agency that churches that do not accept same-sex marriage have a genuine concern that they be subject to penalties such as losing public benefits or receiving lawsuits. He argued that the state should just allot people "civil licenses", with the terminology "marriage" left "as a religious concept" for groups to debate outside the scope of government.

=== Liberal advocacy ===
Though often introduced from conservative commentators, marriage privatization has received attention from advocates on the left. In 2003 left-leaning political columnist and journalist Michael Kinsley wrote a second essay to appear in Slate on the topic. Kinsley's essay is titled "Abolish Marriage: Let's Really Get the Government out of Our Bedrooms". Kinsley follows the model set by his libertarian counterparts Boaz and McElroy; like Elders, he emphasizes marriage privatization's potential to end the controversy over same-sex marriage:

If marriage were an entirely private affair, all the disputes over gay marriage would become irrelevant. Gay marriage would not have the official sanction of government, but neither would straight marriage. There would be official equality between the two, which is the essence of what gays want and are entitled to. And if the other side is sincere in saying that its concern is not what people do in private, but government endorsement of a gay "lifestyle" or "agenda", that problem goes away, too.

Marriage privatization received attention from the legal scholar Alan Dershowitz in 2003 when Dershowitz wrote a Los Angeles Times editorial titled "To Fix Gay Dilemma, Government Should Quit the Marriage Business". More so than commentators from the right, Dershowitz frames his view on the topic in terms of church-state separation; unlike libertarian leaning discussions, Dershowitz maintains that the state does have an interest in the secular rights of marriage. Dershowitz proposes that civil-unions, as a secular replacement for state sanctioned marriage, be extended to both same-sex and opposite-sex couples. Under Dershowitz's conception of privatization, couples have a choice as to whether or not they wish to be married by a cleric willing to perform a marriage ceremony or to exclusively partake of secular/state-sanctioned civil unions. Dershowitz writes:

Not only would this solution be good for gays and for those who oppose gay marriage on religious grounds, it would also strengthen the wall of separation between church and state by placing a sacred institution entirely in the hands of the church while placing a secular institution under state control.

=== Public policy advocacy and academia ===
In 2007 the Center for Inquiry, a secular think tank, released a position paper authored by analyst Ruth Mitchell titled "Same-Sex Marriage and Marriage". The paper argues from the separation of church and state that as long as marriage is available to heterosexual couples it ought to be equally available to LGBT couples. Nevertheless, the position paper claims that state endorsement of civil unions for both types of couples is the most appropriate policy in light of separation of church and state.

The argument for marriage privatization has also been formulated in academic scholarship. In 2008 an argument for marriage privatization appeared in the public policy journal Public Affairs Quarterly. In that issue philosopher Lawrence Torcello offers a detailed model of marriage privatization based on the later political writings of the 20th century political philosopher John Rawls. The article is titled "Is The State Endorsement of Any Marriage Justifiable? Same-Sex Marriage, Civil Unions, and The Marriage Privatization Model."

In the 1993 book Political Liberalism, Rawls argues that arguments in a pluralistic society must be hashed out in terms that all members of that society can understand if not endorse. This means that in making public claims one must refrain from religious or otherwise controversial metaphysical claims that cannot, in principle, be equally endorsed by reasonable persons. In doing this, one is relying on what Rawls refers to as public reason.

In his article, Torcello claims that any state endorsement of marriage represents an inappropriate public endorsement of a comprehensive religious or otherwise metaphysical doctrine, which underlies any particular definition of marriage. Accordingly, taking public reason seriously leads to the idea that legalization of same-sex marriage may be just as neutrally unbalanced as its ban. In place of the public institute of marriage, Torcello, like Dershowitz, argues that civil unions providing the full extent of marital benefits under law ought to be instituted for both heterosexual and homosexual couples. According to the argument, such civil unions ought to replace the current legal institute of marriage. Once privatized, marriage is open for individuals to define and embrace or ignore as they see fit, within the scope of their private religious or philosophical belief systems:

No religious model that rejects same-sex marriage would be required to perform same-sex marriages under this privatized model. Under this model a couple, either heterosexual or homosexual, would obtain a civil union in order to have public and legal recognition of their partnership; they would have a private marriage ceremony if they so chose in order to honor their private religious or philosophical concept of marriage.

In a July 2008 article appearing in The Monist titled "Privatizing Marriage", Harvard Law Professor Cass Sunstein and University of Chicago economist Richard H. Thaler offer arguments for the privatization of marriage. Thaler and Sunstein also take up the topic in their co-authored 2008 book Nudge: Improving Decisions about Wealth, Health, and Happiness. Sunstein and Thaler argue for marriage privatization among other positions under the heading of what they call "Libertarian Paternalism".

== Arguments opposing the privatization of marriage ==
Opposition to marriage privatization, like its endorsement, is equally likely to be found arising from conservative or liberal sources and a wide variety of objections are made.

Conservative evangelical baptist R. Albert Mohler Jr. has stated that he opposes the privatization of marriage because "markets do not always encourage or support moral behavior" and he believes the proposal would destroy "marriage as a public institution".

Princeton professor Robert P. George has argued that marriage has an important cultural role in helping children develop into "basically honest, decent law-abiding people of goodwill—citizens—who can take their rightful place in society". Thus, he concludes, "Family is built on marriage, and government—the state—has a profound interest in the integrity and well-being of marriage, and to write it off as if it were purely a religiously significant action and not an institution and action that has a profound public significance, would be a terrible mistake". This position is seconded by Jennifer Roback Morse, who argues that if literally anyone can define marriage as whatever they want, the state forfeits the ability to sufficiently secure the best interests of children.

Stanley Kurtz of National Review has written that privatization would be a "disaster". He argued that government "still has to decide what sort of private unions merit benefits... under this privatization scheme", and then "we also get the same quarrels over social recognition that we got before privatization." He commented that the government will have to deal with polygamous, polyamorous, and incestuous relationships attempting to obtain contracts under the new scheme as well as attempts by heterosexual acquaintances to make "marriages of convenience" to obtain things such as spousal medical insurance. His National Review colleague Maggie Gallagher has also called privatization a "fantasy" since "[t]here is scarcely a dollar that state and federal government spends on social programs that is not driven in large part by family fragmentation: crime, poverty, drug abuse, teen pregnancy, school failure, mental and physical health problems."

University of Virginia School of Law professor Gregg Strauss argued against the privatization of marriage in “Why the State Cannot 'Abolish Marriage': A Partial Defense of Legal Marriage”

== Issues involved with privatizing marriage ==
In general, a legal contract signed between two or more people will often include penalties for the severing of the contract by a party or parties. However, this generally does not apply to marriages in the US, which usually fall under the legal standard of no-fault divorce. It remains an open issue as to whether or not these quasi-marriage partnership contracts will be enforced with penalties.

== See also ==
- Domestic partnership
- Prenuptial agreement
- Postnuptial agreement
- Self-uniting marriage
