= Secularism =

Position that religion should not influence civic and state affairs

Secularism is the principle of seeking to conduct human affairs based on naturalistic considerations, uninvolved with religion. It is most commonly thought of as the separation of religion from civil affairs and the state and may be broadened to a similar position seeking to remove or to minimize the role of religion in any public sphere. Secularism may encapsulate anti-clericalism, atheism, agnosticism, naturalism, non-sectarianism, neutrality on topics of religion, or antireligion. Although often conflated with opposition to religion, secularism is concerned with minimizing its role rather than disproving it, and may be either hostile, neutral or hospitable to religion. When presented as a philosophy, secularism is another term for naturalism, seeking to interpret life based on principles derived solely from the material world and focusing only on "temporal" and material concerns.

There are distinct traditions of secularism like the French, Turkish, American and Indian models. These differ greatly, from the American emphasis on avoiding an established religion and freedom of belief, to the French interventionist model, and more. The purposes and arguments in support of secularism vary widely, ranging from assertions that it is a crucial element of modernization, or that religion and traditional values are backward and divisive, to the claim that it is the only guarantor of free religious exercise.

== Variations ==
Secularism takes different forms with varying stances on where and how religion should be separate from other aspects of society. People of any religious denomination can support a secular society, or adopt the principles of secularism, although secularist identity is often associated with non-religious individuals such as atheists. Political secularism encompasses the schools of thought in secularism that consider the regulation of religion by a secular state. Religious minorities and non-religious citizens tend to support political secularism while members of the majority religion tend to oppose it. Secular nationalists are people that support political secularism within their own state.

Scholars identify several variations of political secularism in society. The strictest form, associated with the French laique model, advocates a state that is both firmly and officially distanced from all religions and non-religious philosophical convictions in all of its manifestations and official dealings, without exception. A more "humanistic" form is indifferent towards religions per se but also advocates for the states to operate on purely a rational basis of evidence-based policy and a focus on human needs and welfare, entailing non-discrimination between peoples of differing religions and non-religious philosophical convictions throughout society. A third "liberal" or "pillarized" form of secularism holds that governments may in some instances express sympathy to, provide funding to, license state services to, or otherwise allow unique special treatment of religions (common in German-speaking and Benelux secular states), so long as states nevertheless treat these convictions equally, and are neither hostile nor preferential towards any particular set of religious or non-religious philosophical convictions such as humanists. In these countries, secular humanist organizations typically receive state funding according to the same funding formulas used to provide state funding to religious groups. In Indian political discourse, the pejorative term pseudo-secularism is also used to highlight instances where it is believed that while the state purports to be secular, indifferent, or impartial towards religions, its policies in reality favour a particular religion over others.

There are many principles that are associated with all forms of political secularism. It typically promotes legal equality between people of different religions, opposing a legal hierarchy on the basis of religious belief or lack of religious belief. It is also associated with a separation of church and state, considering these to be two distinct entities that should be treated separately. State supremacy is a secular principle that supports obedience to the rule of law over religious diktat or canon law, while internal constraint is a secular principle that opposes governmental control over one's personal life. Under political secularism, the government can enforce how people act but not what they believe. Similarly, freedom of thought is supported by secularism. Order is supported by secularists, specifically in that one's beliefs should not be permitted to disturb the civil peace. Religious tolerance is supported both for people of other religions and for a lack of piety demonstrated by members of one's own religion. Political secularism also supports reason as a virtue. Secularists also support freedom from religion as an extension to freedom of religion.

=== Diversity ===
"Secular", like "religion", are Western concepts that are not universal across cultures, languages, or time; with experiences of secularism varying significantly. There are many debates about the boundaries of both religion and secular and some have suggested "post-secular" models since there are areas of growth of religious influence which challenge the underlying assumptions on conventional views on secularism. Secularism overlaps with religion historically, as it has origins going back to the ancient world into religious texts such as the Bible, being refined through history by religious thinkers. Secular individuals hold complex relations to religion. Global studies show that many people who do not identify with a religion still hold religious beliefs and participate in religious practices.

== History ==
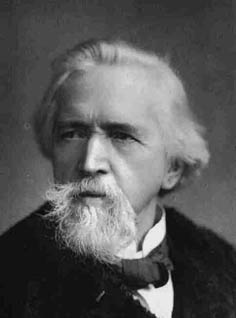
The British writer George Holyoake (1817–1906) employed the term "secularism" in 1851.

Secularism and "secular" is a Western concept that is not universal across cultures, languages, or history. The term "secularism" was coined in 1851 in Britain. In societies such as Ancient Greece, a limited secularism was practised in which religion was not involved in governance, though it was still prevalent in public life.

Secularism's origins can be traced to the Bible itself and fleshed out throughout Christian history into the modern era. The "Secular" is a part of the Christian church's history, which even has secular clergy, since the medieval period. The distinction between secular and religious law was emphasized in the Late Antique and early medieval West. Secular and religious entities could be distinguished in the medieval period, but coexisted and interacted naturally. Significant contributions to principles used in modern secularism came from prominent theologians and Christian writers such as St. Augustine, William of Ockham, Marsilius of Padua, Martin Luther, Roger Williams, John Locke and Talleyrand.

In Europe, secularism emerged as a formal ideology in the early modern period. Due to functional differentiation, religion changed from being the predominant lens through which reality was interpreted to providing only an alternative explanatory approach.

In 1636, Roger Williams founded the Providence Plantations as a settlement with total freedom of religion, in present-day Rhode Island. Secular ideas were strongly challenged by religious leaders and the Catholic Church in particular, causing a religious culture war. During the American Revolution, Thomas Jefferson and James Madison incorporated the ideas of John Locke into the government of the United States, including his secularism, though a true secular state was not achieved until the 20th century. French secularism in the Age of Enlightenment was based on Gallicanism, which emphasised state supremacy, as well as anti-clericalism and materialism. Revolutionary France opposed Catholic influence in the country, and it briefly replaced Christianity with the deistic Cult of Reason.

The first to use the already-extant word "secularism" in a modern sense, was the British agnostic writer George Holyoake, in 1851. Finding "atheism" too aggravating, he sought a term that would describe a stance advocating to conduct life based on naturalistic (secular) considerations only, but without necessarily rejecting religion, thus enabling cooperation with believers. Holyoake's definition of secularism differs from its usage by later writers. As the Humanist Heritage website notes, Holyoake provides a definition of secularism "much akin to modern definitions of humanism... broader than just atheism". More modern definitions of secularism are likely to pertain to separation of church and state rather than personal beliefs.

Many Christian countries began to undergo societal secularisation during the 20th century, with levels of belief and practice declining. Sociologists disagree as to whether this represents a periodic fluctuation or a larger trend toward long-term adoption of secularism. The principle of Laïcité, the French notion of strict separation, was enshrined into law in 1905. After the rise to power of Mustafa Kemal Atatürk in 1923, Turkish secularism, or laiklik, became a state ideology under Kemalism, aiming to modernise the country. Turkey's secular tradition prior to Atatürk's reforms was limited, and 20th century Turkish secularism was initially modelled after French laïcité. Turkey remains virtually the only Muslim-majority nation with an effective secular government, though secularism remains a controversial ideology in Turkey, and the country's ruling party AKP is more anti-Kemalist than anti-secularist. India became a secular state after it achieved independence in 1947; Mahatma Gandhi supported pluralist secularism as a means to curb tensions in the religiously diverse nation. The Indian model of secularism stressed equality of citizens regardless of faith before the law, along with some separation. The Universal Declaration of Human Rights was proclaimed in 1948, protecting freedom of religion in international law.

== State secularism ==
Countries that are Secular Non-secular

Countries with a state religion Non-denominational Christianity Protestantism Orthodox Christianity Catholicism Non-denominational Islam Sunni Islam Shi'a Islam Buddhism None (Secularism)

In political terms, secularism is a movement towards the separation of religion and government, often termed the separation of church and state. This can refer to reducing ties between a government and a state religion, replacing laws based on scripture (such as Halakha, Dharmaśāstra, and Sharia) with civil laws, and eliminating discrimination on the basis of religion. This is said to add to democracy by protecting the rights of religious minorities. Separation of church and state is one possible strategy to be deployed by secular governments. From the democratic to the authoritarian, such governments share a concern to limit the religious side in the relationship. Each state may find its own unique policy prescriptions. These may include separation, careful monitoring and regulation of organized religion such as in France, Turkey, India and others.

In accord with the belief in the separation of church and state, secularists tend to prefer that politicians make decisions for secular rather than religious reasons. In this respect, policy decisions pertaining to topics like abortion, contraception, embryonic stem cell research, same-sex marriage, and sex education are prominently focused upon by American secularist organizations such as the Center for Inquiry. Religious fundamentalists often oppose a secular form of government, arguing that it contradicts the character of historically religious nations, or infringes on their rights to express themselves in the public sphere. In the United States, for example, the word "secularism" became equivalent to "anti-religion" due to such efforts. Religious minorities, however, often support secularism as a means of defending their rights against the majority.

State secularism is most often associated with the Age of Enlightenment in Europe and it plays a major role in Western society. Some of the best known examples of states considered "constitutionally secular" are the United States, France, Turkey, India, Mexico, and South Korea, though none of these nations have identical forms of governance with respect to religion. For example, in India, secularism does not completely separate state and religion, while in France, secularism precludes such mutual involvement.

=== Frameworks ===
Separationist secularism enforces the separation of church and state. Under this system, the state does not support any religious group and does not enforce religious laws. Challenges facing separationist secularism include how the government should regulate secular activities of religious groups and how to govern separately from religion when citizens, including government employees, are religious. The federal judiciary of the United States interpreted the United States Constitution as supporting this system during the 20th century, based on the ideas of John Locke and Thomas Jefferson.

Laïcité is a secularist framework developed and used in France. Under this system, the state has legal supremacy over religion and enforces the restriction of religion in the public sphere. It was established by a 1905 law, and subsequent laws have restricted the use of religious iconography in public or by children. Kemalist secularism, or laiklik, is an adaptation of laïcité that Mustafa Kemal Atatürk established in Turkey in the 1920s and 1930s.

Accommodationism is a system of actively supporting religion in general without favouring a specific religious sect. Under this system, the state applies few restrictions to religion and often provides religious organizations with financial support. India uses this system, incorporating Western ideas of secularism in combination with the Indian tradition of religious and ethnic pluralism. One source of disagreement regarding accommodationism in India is the right of Muslims to live under both the civil code and Sharia simultaneously and the complications that result from this. Accommodationism also has a history in the United States, and the U.S. has increasingly moved toward accommodationism in the 21st century.

State atheism is a total ban on religion. Under this system, the state enforces laws that do not allow religious practice or the expression of religious beliefs in society. Unlike other secularist frameworks, state atheism does not permit freedom of thought or the separation of government from personal belief. Because of this distinction, state atheism may or may not be considered a form of secularism. It is typically associated with Marxism and Communist states, in which it is described as "scientific atheism".

== Secular society ==
In studies of religion, modern democracies are generally recognized as secular. This is due to the near-complete freedom of religion (religious beliefs generally are not subject to legal or social sanctions), and the lack of authority of religious leaders over political decisions. Nevertheless, it has been claimed that surveys done by Pew Research Center show Americans as generally being more comfortable with religion playing a major role in public life, while in Europe the impact of the church on public life is declining.

Most societies become increasingly secular as the result of social, economic development and progress, rather than through the actions of a dedicated secular movement. Modern sociology has, since Max Weber, often been preoccupied with the problem of authority in secularised societies and with secularisation as a sociological or historical process. Contemporary ethical debate in the West is often described as "secular", as it is detached from religious considerations. Twentieth-century scholars, whose work has contributed to the understanding of these matters, include Carl L. Becker, Karl Löwith, Hans Blumenberg, M. H. Abrams, Peter L. Berger, Paul Bénichou and D. L. Munby, among others.

There is not one singular secular culture, as different people identify as secularists for different reasons and under different belief systems. Secularism is typically associated with progressivism and social liberalism. In democratic countries, middle and upper class white urban males with high education are more likely to identify as secularist than any other demographic group. In societies where secularism is more common, such as in Western Europe, demographics of secularists are closer to even. How a society considers what is secular may also change, where nominally spiritual beliefs become part of public or private life without being recognized as religious. As secularists are a minority in most communities, secularism is often stigmatized. Proponents of religious society challenge secular society on the basis of morality, saying that secularism lacks a meaningful way to incentivize moral behaviour among its members.

== Secular philosophy ==
Secularism is considered in political philosophy and philosophy of religion. As a philosophy, secularism is closely associated with naturalism and materialism, rejecting consideration of immaterial or supernatural substances, such as a soul, in favour of a material universe. This secular materialism and rationalism forms the basis of most modern empirical science. During the Age of Enlightenment, liberal European philosophers such as Baruch Spinoza, John Locke, Montesquieu, Voltaire, David Hume, Adam Smith, and Jean-Jacques Rousseau all proposed various forms of separation of church and state. The work of well known moral philosophers such as Derek Parfit and Peter Singer, and even the whole field of contemporary bioethics, have been described as explicitly secular or non-religious.

A major issue considered by secular philosophy is the nature of morality in a material universe. Secular ethics and secular morality describe systems of right and wrong that do not depend on religious or supernatural concepts. Much of the philosophy of Friedrich Nietzsche is developed in response to this issue. Under secular ethics, good is typically defined as that which contributes to "human flourishing and justice" rather than an abstract or idealized conception of good. Secular ethics are often considered within the frame of humanism.

=== Secularism in late 20th century political philosophy ===
It can be seen by many of the organizations (NGOs) for secularism that they prefer to define secularism as the common ground for all life stance groups, religious or atheistic, to thrive in a society that honours freedom of speech and conscience. An example of that is the National Secular Society in the UK. This is a common understanding of what secularism stands for among many of its activists throughout the world. However, many scholars of Christianity and conservative politicians will often interpret secularism as an antithesis of religion and an attempt to push religion out of society and replace it with atheism or a void of values, nihilism. This dual aspect (as noted above in "Secular ethics") has created difficulties in political discourse on the subject. Most political theorists in philosophy following the landmark work of John Rawls' A Theory of Justice in 1971 and its following book, Political Liberalism (1993), will use the conjoined concept overlapping consensus rather than secularism. In the latter Rawls holds the idea of an overlapping consensus as one of three main ideas of political liberalism. He argues that the term secularism cannot apply;

But what is a secular argument? Some think of any argument that is reflective and critical, publicly intelligible and rational, as a secular argument; [...], Nevertheless, a central feature of political liberalism is that it views all such arguments the same way it views religious ones, and therefore these secular philosophical doctrines do not provide public reasons. Secular concepts and reasoning of this kind belong to first philosophy and moral doctrine, and fall outside the domain of the political.

Still, Rawl's theory is akin to Holyoake's vision of a tolerant democracy that treats all life stance groups alike. Rawl's idea is that it is in everybody's own interest to endorse "a reasonable constitutional democracy" with "principles of toleration". His work has been highly influential on scholars in political philosophy and his term, overlapping consensus, seems to have for many parts replaced secularism among them. In textbooks on modern political philosophy, like Colin Farrelly's, An Introduction to Contemporary Political Theory, and Will Kymlicka's, Contemporary Political Philosophy, the term secularism is not even indexed and in the former it can be seen only in one footnote. However, there is no shortage of discussion and coverage of the topic it involves. It is just called overlapping consensus, pluralism, multiculturalism or expressed in some other way. In The Oxford Handbook of Political Theory, there is one chapter called "Political secularism", by Rajeev Bhargava. It covers secularism in a global context, and starts with this sentence: "Secularism is a beleaguered doctrine."

== See also ==
- Desecularization – Proliferation or growth of religion
- Postsecularism – Theories about the persistence or resurgence of religion
- Secular liberalism – Form of liberalism which involves secular values

== Bibliography ==
- Arvidsson, Stefan (2025). Secularist, Religious and Scientistic Socialism: Red Faith 1. Routledge. ISBN 9781032710853.
- Berlinerblau, Jacques (2021). Secularism: The Basics (1st ed.). Routledge. ISBN 9780367691578.
- Copson, Andrew (2019). Secularism: A Very Short Introduction. Oxford University Press. ISBN 9780198747222.
- Weier!first= T.H. (2014). Secularism and Religion in Nineteenth-Century Germany: The Rise of the Fourth Confession. Cambridge University Press. ISBN 9781107300378.
