= Justice as Fairness: A Restatement =

2001 book by John Rawls

- Cover of the first edition
- Author: John Rawls
- Language: English
- Subject: Justice
- Publisher: Belknap Press
- Publication date: 2001
- Publication place: United States
- Media type: Print
- ISBN: 0-674-00510-4

Justice as Fairness: A Restatement is a 2001 book of political philosophy by the philosopher John Rawls, published as a restatement of his classic work A Theory of Justice (1971). The restatement was made largely in response to the significant number of critiques and essays written about his earlier book on this subject. The released book was edited by Erin Kelly while Rawls was in declining health during his final years.

== Background ==
This shorter summary of the main arguments of Rawls' political philosophy was edited by Erin Kelly. Prior to publication, many versions were circulated in typescript and much of the material was delivered by Rawls in lectures when he taught courses covering his own work at Harvard University. A previous article with a similar title was written in 1985.

== Summary ==
Justice as Fairness is a revision of Rawls's A Theory of Justice (1971). Rawls is responding to criticism as well as adding further thought to his earlier A Theory of Justice. It was written shortly before his death in 2002. In part I, he discusses several fundamental ideas, all of which are familiar to readers of his earlier book as well as Political Liberalism (1995): a well-ordered society; the basic structure of society; the original position; free and equal persons; public justification; reflective equilibrium; and overlapping consensus. In part II, he moves on to his principles of justice, revising them from his earlier edition, which now read:

(a) Each person has the same indefeasible claim to a fully adequate scheme of equal basic liberties, which scheme is compatible with the same scheme of liberties for all; and
(b) Social and economic inequalities are to satisfy two conditions: first, they are to be attached to offices and positions open to all under conditions of fair equality of opportunity; and second, they are to be to the greatest benefit of the least-advantaged members of society (the difference principle).

In part III, Rawls expands on his argument for the two principles of the original position. Here he brings in a new concept, that of Public reason, an idea that is not well discussed in A Theory of Justice.

Part IV takes the reader to public institutions that will be present in a just and fair society. He lists five types of social systems:

1. Laissez-faire capitalism
2. Welfare-state capitalism
3. State socialism with a command economy
4. Property-owning democracy
5. Liberal socialism

Rawls holds that the first three "[violate] the two principles of justice in at least one way" (p. 137), thus leaving only (4) property-owning democracy and (5) liberal socialism as the "ideal descriptions" that include "arrangements designed to satisfy the two principles of justice" (p. 138).

In part V he explains why political liberalism is not only possible, but why it is not utopian thinking to believe that such a society is possible.

Looking primarily at the twentieth-century United States, he is certain that institutions within US society are causing injustices. The very expensive campaign finance system essentially rules out all but the very rich from even deciding to run for public office. The healthcare restricts the best care to those who can afford it, leaving the poor to access only the most basic of services.

== Reception ==
The book has been regarded as Rawls's final statement of his theory of justice and is frequently used as an accessible introduction to his mature political philosophy. Scholars have noted that it clarifies several concepts introduced in A Theory of Justice and Political Liberalism, particularly the ideas of public reason and property-owning democracy.

== See also ==
- American philosophy
- "Justice as Fairness"
