= Habermas–Rawls debate =

1995 debate between John Rawls and Jürgen Habermas

The Habermas–Rawls debate is the exchange which took place between John Rawls and Jürgen Habermas in The Journal of Philosophy in 1995. One major point of misunderstanding was Rawls's emphasis on social primary goods in a debate that included Habermasian notions of the public and common good.

== See also ==
- Cassirer–Heidegger debate
- Jacques Derrida § Searle–Derrida debate
- Foucault–Habermas debate
- John Searle § Searle–Derrida debate
