= Justice as Fairness =

1985 essay by John Rawls

"Justice as Fairness: Political not Metaphysical" is an essay by John Rawls, published in 1985. In it he describes his conception of justice. It comprises two main principles of liberty and equality; the second is subdivided into fair equality of opportunity and the difference principle.

Rawls arranges the principles in "lexical priority," prioritizing in the order of the liberty principle, fair equality of opportunity and the difference principle. This order determines the priorities of the principles if they conflict in practice. The principles are, however, intended to form a single, coherent conception of justice (Justice as Fairness) rather than to operate independently. They are consistently applied with the aim of benefiting the least advantaged members of society, ensuring that they are neither harmed nor overlooked.

Rawls originally presented the theory in his 1971 book A Theory of Justice, subsequently expanding upon several of its themes in his later book titled Political Liberalism.

== First principle: the liberty principle ==
The first and most important principle is that everyone has the same rights and fundamental freedoms. Rawls argued that "certain rights and freedoms are more important or fundamental "than others." For example, Samuel Freeman argues, Rawls believes that "personal property"—personal belongings, a home—constitutes a basic liberty, but an absolute right to unlimited private property does not. As a fundamental freedom, these rights are inviolable. The government must not alter, violate or remove such rights from individuals. Thomas Mertens says Rawls believes that the principles of society are chosen by representative citizens on "fair" terms.

Rawls articulates the liberty principle as the most extensive basic liberty compatible with similar liberty for others in A Theory of Justice; he later amended this in Political Liberalism, stating instead that "each person has an equal claim to a fully adequate scheme of equal basic rights and liberties".

== Second principle: the equality principle ==
The principle is part of justice that established distributive justice. Rawls awards the fair equality of opportunity principle lexical priority over the difference principle: Society cannot adjust inequality to maximize the proportion of those who are most vulnerable without providing positions and the opportunities that are necessary for the worse-off to achieve them.

=== Fair equality of opportunity ===
This principle maintains that "offices and positions" have to be open to all, regardless of their social background, caste or gender. This principle is stronger than "formal equality of opportunity." Rawls argues that human potential should not only be a "right," but also an "effective" equal opportunity.

=== Difference principle ===
The difference principle regulates inequalities: it permits only inequalities that work to the advantage of the worst-off. This is often misinterpreted as trickle-down economics; Rawls' argument is more accurately expressed as a system where wealth "diffuses up". By guaranteeing the worst-off in society a fair deal, Rawls compensates for naturally occurring inequalities (talents that one is born with, such as a capacity for sport).

Rawls justifies the difference principle on the basis that, since fair equality of opportunity has lexical priority, the just choice from Pareto optimal scenarios which could occur would be that benefiting the worst-off rather than the best-off.

== Original position ==
A key component of Rawls' argument is his claim that his principles of justice would be chosen by parties in the original position. This is a thought experiment in which the parties select principles that will determine the basic structure of the society they will live in. This choice is made from behind a veil of ignorance, which would deprive participants of information about their particular characteristics: their ethnicity, social status, gender and, crucially, their conception of the good. This forces participants to select principles impartially and rationally.

== See also ==
- Justice as Fairness: A Restatement
- Justice
- Law
