= Punishment =

Imposition of an undesirable or unpleasant outcome

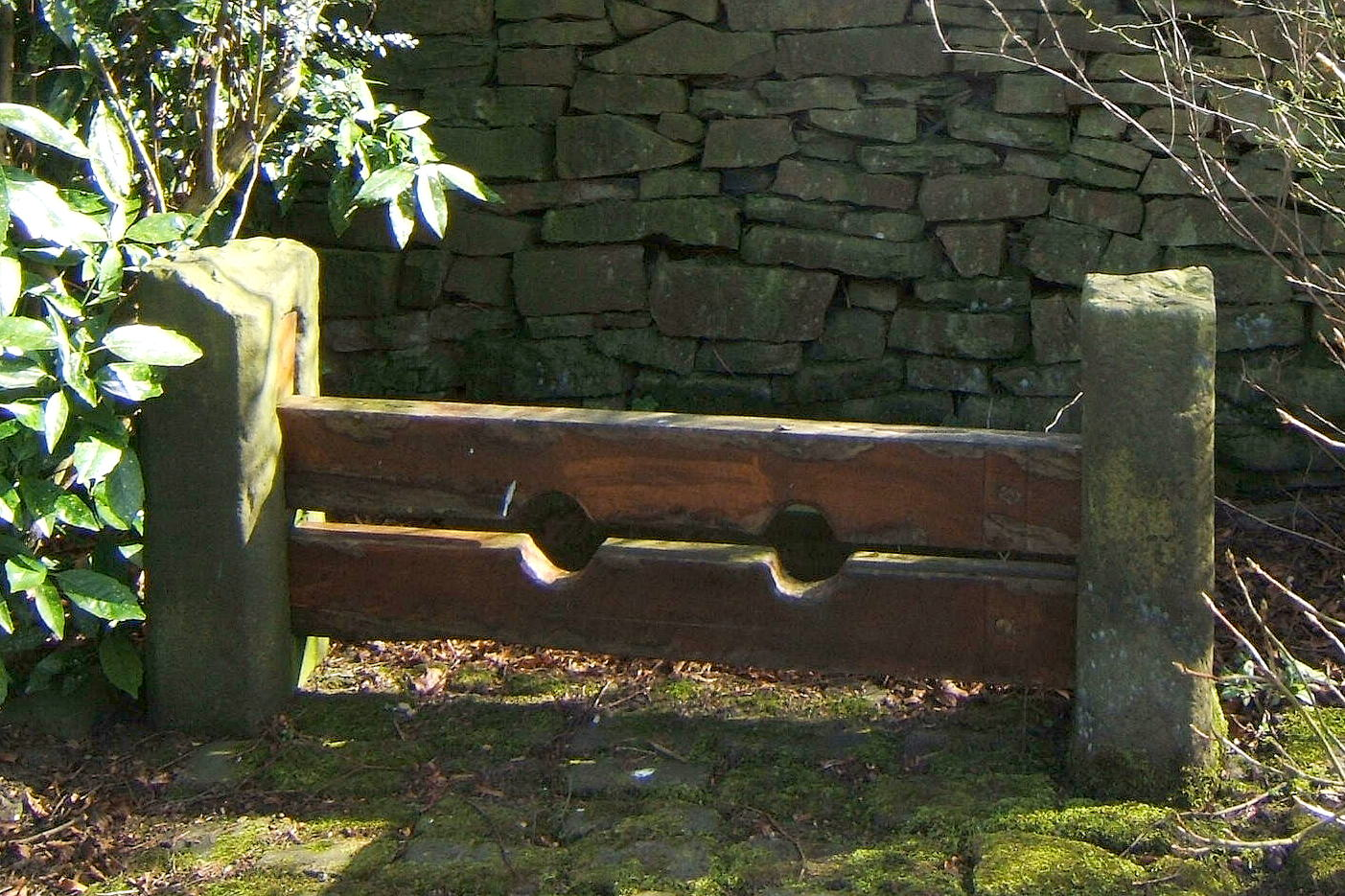
The old village stocks in Chapeltown, Lancashire, England

Punishment is the imposition of an undesirable or unpleasant outcome upon an individual or group, as a response for breaking some norm or rule. The term punishment is used both within and outside of the criminal justice context. For example, punishment outside of criminal law can include child discipline measures or conscious or subconscious impositions of unpleasant measures in a relationship.

A variety of philosophical theories have been developed to justify punishment. Important views argue that punishment deters wrongdoing, rehabilitates offenders, incapacitates the dangerous, or gives justice to those who deserve it. Moral justifications of punishment are found even in ancient civilisations, with Aristotle writing extensively of the ethical implications of imposing pain onto an individual or group.

Punishment can differ in its degree of severity, and may include sanctions such as reprimands, removing privileges, deprivation of liberty, fines, incarcerations, ostracism and social shunning, the infliction of pain, amputation and the death penalty. Corporal punishment refers to punishments in which physical pain is intended to be inflicted upon the transgressor. Punishments may be judged as fair or unfair in terms of their degree of reciprocity and proportionality to the offense. Punishment can be an integral part of socialization, and punishing unwanted behavior is often part of a system of pedagogy or behavioral modification which also includes rewards.

== Definitions ==
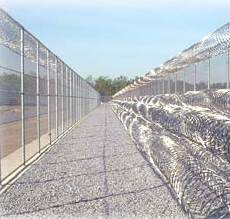
Barbed wire is a feature of prisons.

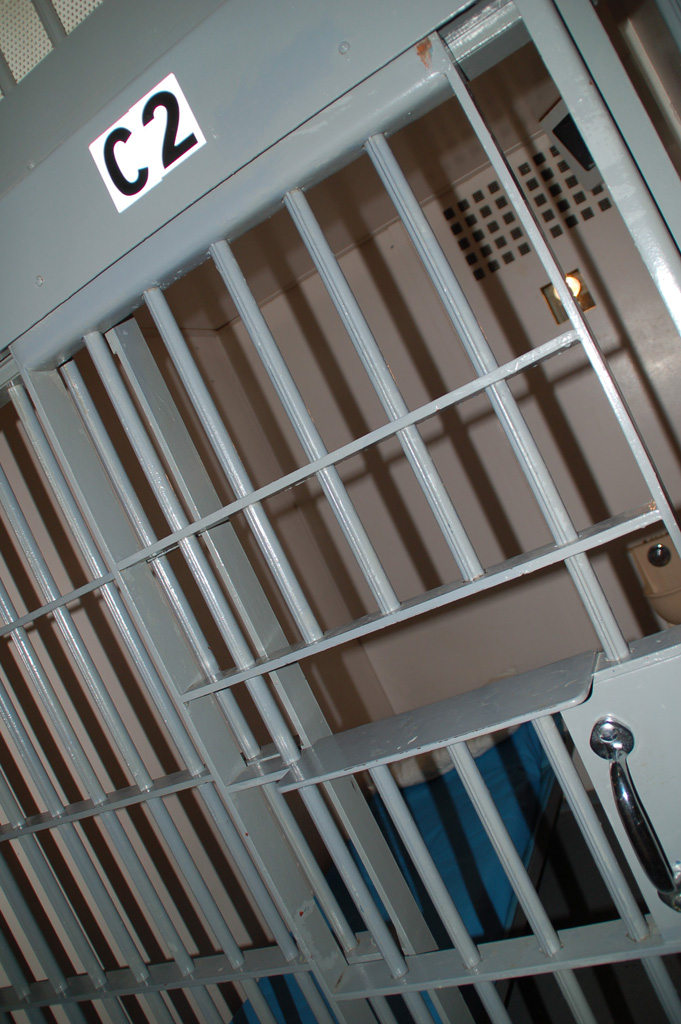
A modern jail cell

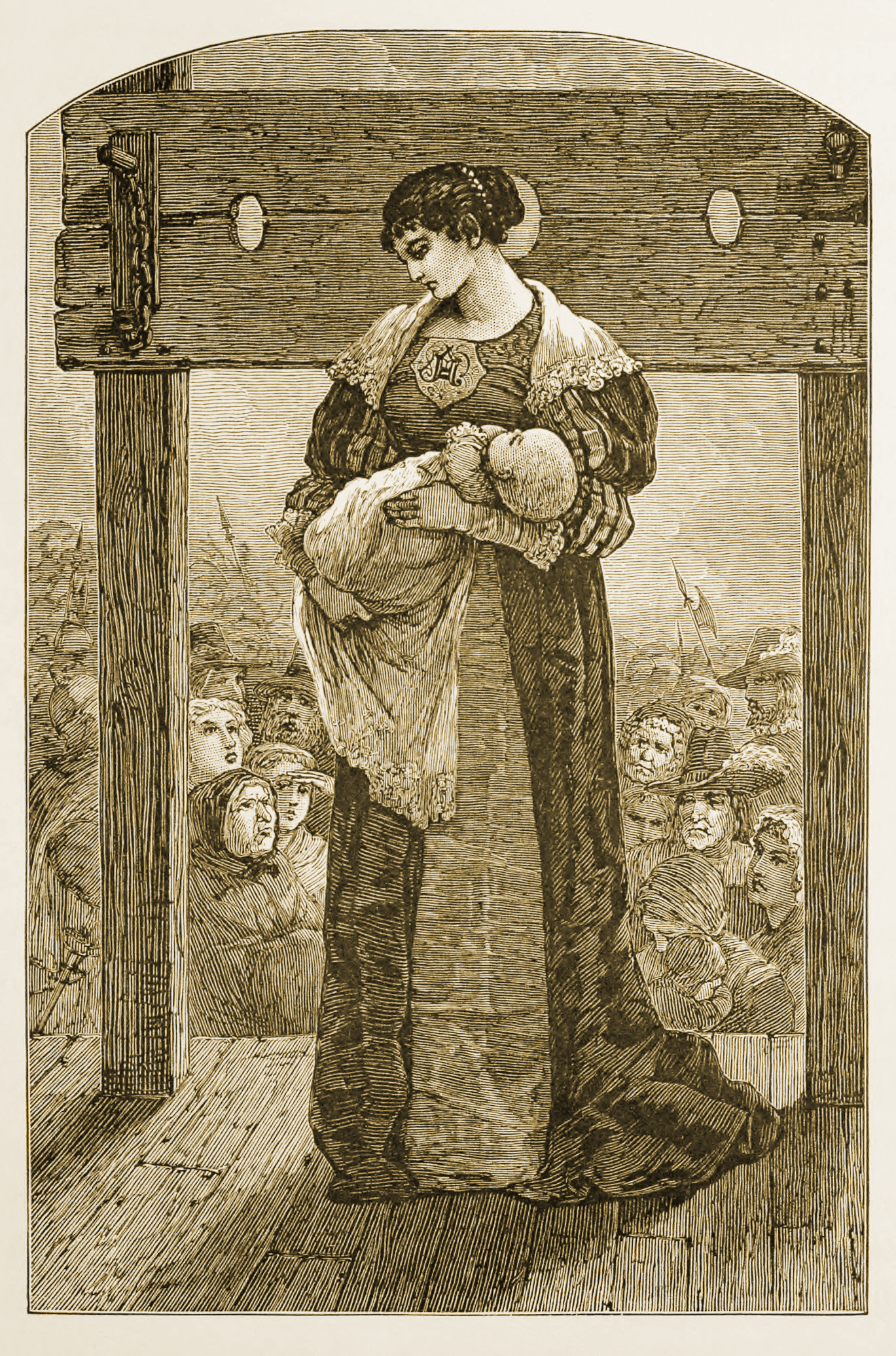
Hester Prynne at the Stocks—an engraved illustration from an 1878 edition of The Scarlet Letter

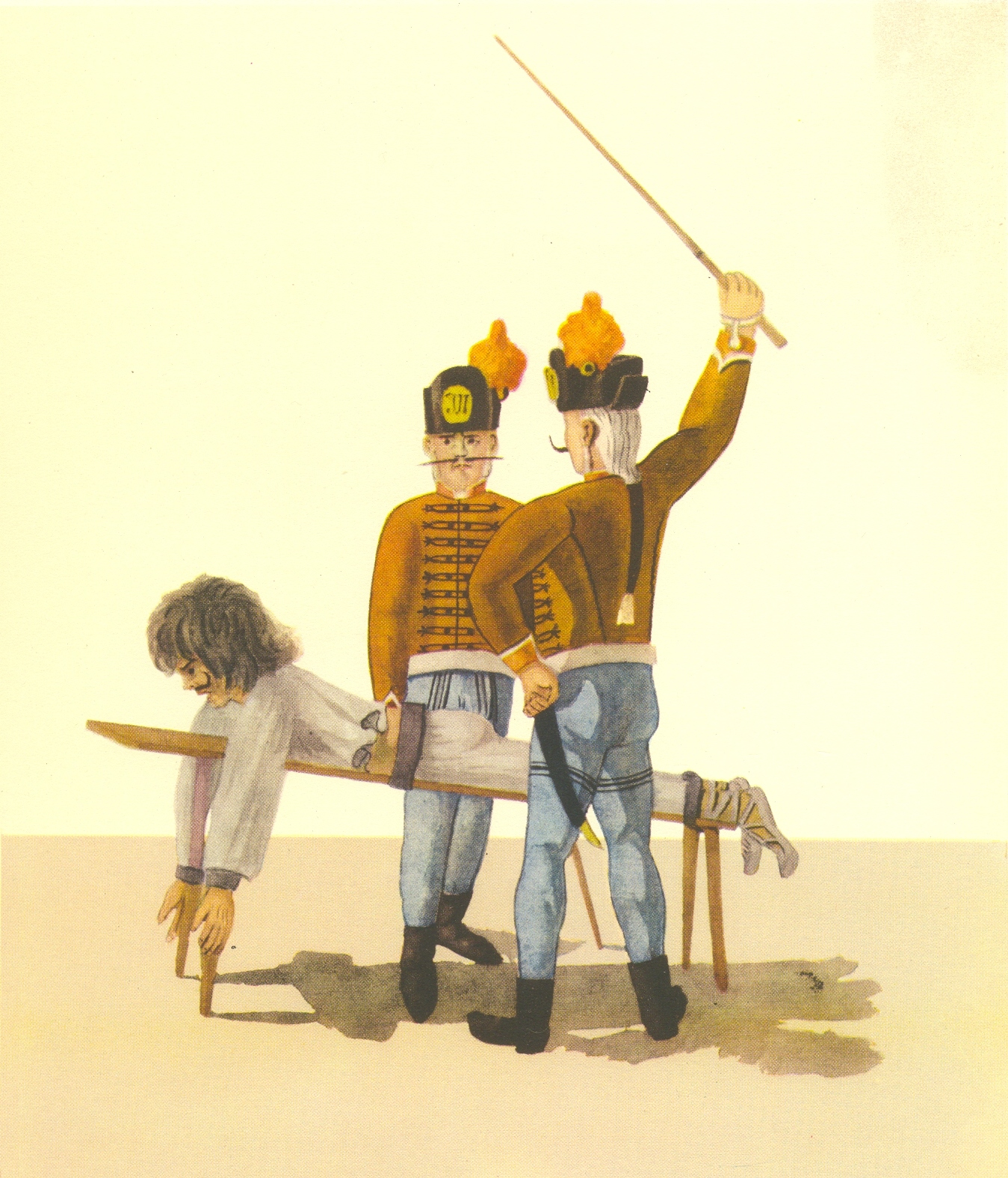
Punishment of an offender in Hungary, 1793

There are a large number of different understandings of what punishment is. These depend as to whether we approach punishment as a criminal justice or everday practice. It also depends on what discipline we use to understand punishment.

=== In philosophy ===
Various philosophers have presented definitions of punishment. Conditions commonly considered necessary properly to describe an action as punishment are that

1. it is imposed by an authority (single or multiple),
2. it involves some loss to the supposed offender,
3. it is in response to an offense and
4. the human (or other animal) to whom the loss is imposed should be deemed at least somewhat responsible for the offence.

The key concern by legal philosophers is the justification of the imposition of punishment and whether the forms that it takes can weight against the intended benefits. Moreover, philosophical definitions of punishment continue to evolve, often challenging some of the aforementioned key components. For example, legal philosopher, Theo Gavrielides, developed a new theory of punishment that is not imposed by an authority, but is self-inflicted. He argued that when this form of punishment is self-inflicted in a voluntary and honest practice (such as restorative justice) it can have profound effects that can lead to transformation and rehabilitation.

=== In psychology ===
Introduced by B.F. Skinner, punishment has a more restrictive and technical definition in psychology. Along with reinforcement, it belongs under the operant conditioning category. Operant conditioning refers to learning with either punishment that discourages the measured behavior, or a reward that encourages the behavior.

In psychology, punishment is the reduction of a behavior via application of an unpleasant stimulus ("positive punishment") or removal of a pleasant stimulus ("negative punishment"). Extra chores or spanking are examples of positive punishment, while grounding a teenager or removing screen time privileges are examples of negative punishment.

The definition requires that punishment is only determined after the fact by the reduction in behavior; if the offending behavior of the subject does not decrease, it is not considered punishment. In operant conditioning terms, punishment does not need to involve any type of pain, fear, or physical actions; even a brief spoken expression of disapproval, or calmly telling a student that they answered a question incorrectly, is a type of punishment, if the result is a decrease in the behavior (e.g., a decrease in giving that wrong answer to that question). There is some conflation of punishment and aversives, though an aversion that does not decrease behavior is not considered punishment in psychology. Additionally, "aversive stimulus" is a label behaviorists generally apply to negative reinforcers (as in avoidance learning), rather than the punishers.

=== In socio-biology ===
Punishment is sometimes called retaliatory or moralistic aggression; it has been observed in all species of social animals, leading evolutionary biologists to conclude that it is an evolutionarily stable strategy, selected because it favors cooperative behavior.

However, other evolutionary biologists have argued against punishment to favour cooperation. Dreber et al. demonstrate that while the availability of costly punishment can enhance cooperative behavior, it does not improve the group's average payoff. Additionally, there is a significant negative relationship between the overall payoff and the employment of costly punishment. Individuals who achieve the highest total payoffs generally avoid using costly punishment. This indicates that employing costly punishment in cooperative games may be disadvantageous and suggests that it may have evolved for purposes other than promoting cooperation.

Achieving a certain proportion of trust in the population can lead to self-governance without the need for punishment.

==== Examples against sociobiological use ====
There are also arguments against the notion of punishment requiring intelligence, based on studies of punishment in very small-brained animals such as insects. There is proof of honey bee workers with mutations that makes them fertile laying eggs only when other honey bees are not observing them, and that the few that are caught in the act are killed. This is corroborated by computer simulations proving that a few simple reactions well within mainstream views of the extremely limited intelligence of insects are sufficient to emulate the "political" behavior observed in great apes. The authors argue that this falsifies the claim that punishment evolved as a strategy to deal with individuals capable of knowing what they are doing.

In the case of more complex brains, the notion of evolution selecting for specific punishment of intentionally chosen breaches of rules and/or wrongdoers capable of intentional choices (for example, punishing humans for murder while not punishing lethal viruses) is subject to criticism from coevolution issues. That punishment of individuals with certain characteristics (including but, in principle, not restricted to mental abilities) selects against those characteristics, making evolution of any mental abilities considered to be the basis for penal responsibility impossible in populations subject to such selective punishment. Certain scientists argue that this disproves the notion of humans having a biological feeling of intentional transgressions deserving to be punished.

== Scope of application ==
Punishments are applied for various purposes, most generally, to encourage and enforce proper behavior as defined by society or family. Criminals are punished judicially, by fines, corporal punishment or custodial sentences such as prison; detainees risk further punishments for breaches of internal rules. Children, pupils and other trainees may be punished by their educators or instructors (mainly parents, guardians, or teachers, tutors and coaches)—see Child discipline.

Slaves, domestic and other servants were subject to punishment by their masters. Employees can still be subject to a contractual form of fine or demotion. Most hierarchical organizations, such as military and police forces, or even churches, still apply quite rigid internal discipline, even with a judicial system of their own (court martial, canonical courts).

Punishment may also be applied on moral, especially religious, grounds, as in penance (which is voluntary) or imposed in a theocracy with a religious police (as in a strict Islamic state like Iran or under the Taliban) or (though not a true theocracy) by Inquisition.

== Justification of punishment ==
There are many possible reasons that might be given to justify or explain why someone ought to be punished. The justification of punishment has captured the interest of many philosophers throughout history including Aristotle, John Stuart Mill, Jeremy Bentham and many others. While some, such as Mill and Bentham, draw its explanation through utilitarian perspectives, others look at liberalism as a philosophy. More recently, additional approaches have been developed to justify punishment including social contract theory and restorative justice pain.

A principle often mentioned with respect to the degree of punishment to be meted out is that the punishment should match the crime. One standard for measurement is the degree to which a crime affects others or society. Measurements of the degree of seriousness of a crime have been developed. A felony is generally considered to be a crime of "high seriousness", while a misdemeanor is not. Here follows a broad outline of typical, possibly conflicting, justifications.

The reasoning for punishment may be to condition a child to avoid self-endangerment, to impose social conformity (in particular, in the contexts of compulsory education or military discipline), to defend norms, to protect against future harms (in particular, those from violent crime), and to maintain the law—and respect for rule of law—under which the social group is governed. Punishment may be self-inflicted as with self-flagellation and mortification of the flesh in the religious setting, but is most often a form of social coercion.

The unpleasant imposition may include a fine, penalty, or confinement, or be the removal or denial of something pleasant or desirable. The individual may be a person, or even an animal. The authority may be either a group or a single person, and punishment may be carried out formally under a system of law or informally in other kinds of social settings such as within a family. Negative or unpleasant impositions that are not authorized or that are administered without a breach of rules are not considered to be punishment as defined here. The study and practice of the punishment of crimes, particularly as it applies to imprisonment, is called penology, or, often in modern texts, corrections; in this context, the punishment process is euphemistically called "correctional process". Research into punishment often includes similar research into prevention.

Justifications for punishment include retribution, deterrence, rehabilitation, and incapacitation. The last could include such measures as isolation, in order to prevent the wrongdoer's having contact with potential victims, or the removal of a hand in order to make theft more difficult.

If only some of the conditions included in the definition of punishment are present, descriptions other than "punishment" may be considered more accurate. Inflicting something negative, or unpleasant, on a person or animal, without authority or not on the basis of a breach of rules is typically considered only revenge or spite rather than punishment. In addition, the word "punishment" is used as a metaphor, as when a boxer experiences "punishment" during a fight. In other situations, breaking a rule may be rewarded, and so receiving such a reward naturally does not constitute punishment. Finally the condition of breaking (or breaching) the rules must be satisfied for consequences to be considered punishment.

=== Deterrence ===
Reasons given to justify punishment include that it is a measure to prevent people from committing an offense — deterring previous offenders from re-offending, and preventing those who may be contemplating an offence they have not committed from actually committing it. This punishment is intended to be sufficient that people would rather choose not to commit the crime than experience the punishment. The aim is to deter everyone in the community from committing offences.

Some criminologists state that the number of people convicted for crime does not decrease as a result of more severe punishment and conclude that deterrence is ineffective. Other criminologists object to said conclusion, citing that while most people do not know the exact severity of punishment such as whether the sentence for murder is 40 years or life, most people still know the rough outlines such as the punishments for armed robbery or forcible rape being more severe than the punishments for driving too fast or misparking a car. These criminologists therefore argue that lack of deterring effect of increasing the sentences for already severely punished crimes say nothing about the significance of the existence of punishment as a deterring factor.

Some criminologists argue that increasing the sentences for crimes can cause criminal investigators to give higher priority to said crimes so that a higher percentage of those committing them are convicted for them, causing statistics to give a false appearance of such crimes increasing. These criminologists argue that the use of statistics to gauge the efficiency of crime fighting methods are a danger of creating a reward hack that makes the least efficient criminal justice systems appear to be best at fighting crime, and that the appearance of deterrence being ineffective may be an example of this.

=== Rehabilitation ===
Some punishment includes work to reform and rehabilitate the culprit so that they will not commit the offence again. This is distinguished from deterrence, in that the goal here is to change the offender's attitude to what they have done, and make them come to see that their behavior was wrong.

=== Incapacitation ===
Incapacitation as a justification of punishment refers to the offender's ability to commit further offences being removed. Imprisonment separates offenders from the community, for example, Australia was a dumping ground for early British criminals. This was their way of removing or reducing the offenders ability to carry out certain crimes. The death penalty does this in a permanent (and irrevocable) way. In some societies, people who stole have been punished by having their hands amputated.

Crewe however, has pointed out that for incapacitation of an offender to work, it must be the case that the offender would have committed a crime had they not been restricted in this way. Should the putative offender not be going to commit further crimes, then they have not been incapacitated. The more heinous crimes such as murders have the lowest levels of recidivism and hence are the least likely offences to be subject to incapacitative effects. Antisocial behaviour and the like display high levels of recidivism and hence are the kind of crimes most susceptible to incapacitative effects. It is shown by life-course studies that long sentences for burglaries amongst offenders in their late teens and early twenties fail to incapacitate when the natural reduction in offending due to ageing is taken into account: the longer the sentence, in these cases, the less the incapacitative effect.

=== Retribution ===
Criminal activities typically give a benefit to the offender and a loss to the victim. Punishment has been justified as a measure of retributive justice, in which the goal is to try to rebalance any unjust advantage gained by ensuring that the offender also suffers a loss. Sometimes viewed as a way of "getting even" with a wrongdoer—the suffering of the wrongdoer is seen as a desired goal in itself, even if it has no restorative benefits for the victim. One reason societies have administered punishments is to diminish the perceived need for retaliatory "street justice", blood feud, and vigilantism.

=== Restorative Justice pain ===
This form of punishment can appear both within and outside the criminal justice context. Some have argued that restorative justice is not punishment, while others believe that it is an alternative form of punishment. Gavrielides argued that in the context of restorative justice, the infliction of pain is neither punishment nor an alternative. He argued that it is simply a different type of pain that is self-inflicted and which can lead to catharsis through a voluntary process of responsibility taking. Beyond the ethical and emotional implications of restorative justice punishment, depending on the legal jurisdiction where the offence has taken place, in practice, restorative justice can take the form of community service or compensation orders. In models of restorative justice, victims take an active role in a process with their offenders who are encouraged to take responsibility for their actions, "to repair the harm they've done."

=== Education and denunciation ===
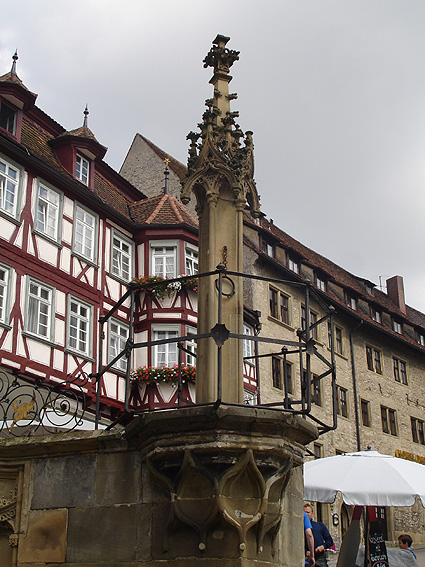
Gothic pillory (early 16th century) in Schwäbisch Hall, Germany

Punishment can be explained by positive prevention theory to use the criminal justice system to teach people what are the social norms for what is correct, and acts as a reinforcement.

Punishment can serve as a means for society to publicly express denunciation of an action as being criminal. Besides educating people regarding what is not acceptable behavior, it serves the dual function of preventing vigilante justice by acknowledging public anger, while concurrently deterring future criminal activity by stigmatizing the offender. This is sometimes called the "Expressive Theory" of denunciation. The pillory was a method for carrying out public denunciation.

Some critics of the education and denunciation model cite evolutionary problems with the notion that a feeling for punishment as a social signal system evolved if punishment was not effective. The critics argue that some individuals spending time and energy and taking risks in punishing others, and the possible loss of the punished group members, would have been selected against if punishment served no function other than signals that could evolve to work by less risky means.

=== Unified theory ===
A unified theory of punishment brings together multiple penal purposes—such as retribution, deterrence and rehabilitation—in a single, coherent framework. Instead of punishment requiring we choose between them, unified theorists argue that they work together as part of some wider goal such as the protection of rights.

=== Hell as punishment ===
Belief that an individual's ultimate punishment is being sent by God, the highest authority, to an existence in Hell, a place believed to exist in the after-life, typically corresponds to sins committed during their life. Sometimes these distinctions are specific, with damned souls suffering for each sin committed (see for example Plato's myth of Er or Dante's The Divine Comedy), but sometimes they are general, with condemned sinners relegated to one or more chamber of Hell or to a level of suffering.

== Criticism ==
=== Arguments from harm ===
Some people think that punishment as a whole is unhelpful and even harmful to the people that it is used against. Detractors argue that punishment is simply wrong, of the same design as "two wrongs make a right". Critics argue that punishment is simply revenge. Professor Deirdre Golash, author of The Case against Punishment: Retribution, Crime Prevention, and the Law, says:

We ought not to impose such harm on anyone unless we have a very good reason for doing so… The deliberate doing of harm in the mistaken belief that it promotes some greater good is the essence of tragedy. We would do well to ask whether the goods we seek in harming offenders are worthwhile, and whether the means we choose will indeed secure them.

Golash also writes about imprisonment:

Imprisonment means, at minimum, the loss of liberty and autonomy, as well as many material comforts, personal security, and access to heterosexual relations. These deprivations, according to Gresham Sykes (who first identified them) "together dealt 'a profound hurt' that went to 'the very foundations of the prisoner's being. But these are only the minimum harms, suffered by the least vulnerable inmates in the best-run prisons. Most prisons are run badly, and in some, conditions are more squalid than in the worst of slums. In the District of Columbia jail, for example, inmates must wash their clothes and sheets in cell toilets because the laundry machines are broken. Vermin and insects infest the building, in which air vents are clogged with decades' accumulation of dust and grime. But even inmates in prisons where conditions are sanitary must still face the numbing boredom and emptiness of prison life—a vast desert of wasted days in which little in the way of meaningful activity is possible.

=== Destructiveness to thinking and betterment ===
There are critics of punishment who argue that punishment aimed at intentional actions forces people to suppress their ability to act on intent. Advocates of this viewpoint argue that such suppression of intention causes the harmful behaviors to remain, making punishment counterproductive. These people suggest that the ability to make intentional choices should instead be treasured as a source of possibilities of betterment, citing that complex cognition would have been an evolutionarily useless waste of energy if it led to justifications of fixed actions and no change as simple inability to understand arguments would have been the most thrifty protection from being misled by them if arguments were for social manipulation, and reject condemnation of people who intentionally did bad things. Punishment can be effective in stopping undesirable employee behaviors such as tardiness, absenteeism or substandard work performance. However, punishment does not necessarily cause an employee to demonstrate a desirable behavior.

=== Commodification of crime ===
In a different vein, Andreas Dorschel takes issue with the economy of punishment. He argues that "the penal code assigns a compensation to every type of crime, which criminals can expect. It effectively places a price tag on it; crime thus becomes a commodity. The dismay at or even horror of crime, upon which morality is built, is thus diminished by the paragraphs of the law."

== See also ==
- Capital punishment
  - Capital and corporal punishment in Judaism
  - List of capital crimes in the Torah
  - List of methods of capital punishment
  - List of people burned as heretics
  - List of people executed for witchcraft
  - Religion and capital punishment
- Coercion
- Corporal punishment
- Devaluation
- Discipline
- Discipline (BDSM)
- Extrajudicial punishment
- Hudud
- Intimidation
- Nulla poena sine lege
- Preventive state
- Suffering
- Telishment
