= The Law of Peoples =

Work by John Rawls

- Author: John Rawls
- Language: English
- Genre: Philosophy
- Published: 1999 (Harvard University Press)
- Publisher: Harvard University Press
- Publication place: United States
- Pages: 208
- ISBN: 9780674005426

The Law of Peoples is American philosopher John Rawls' work on international relations. First published in 1993 as a short article, or "a sketch", in 1999 it was expanded and joined with another essay, "The Idea of Public Reason Revisited" to form a full-length book. Rawls's basic distinction in international politics is that his preferred emphasis on a society of peoples is separate from the more conventional discussion of international politics as based upon relationships between states. It is an attempt to show "how the content of a Law of Peoples might be developed out of a liberal idea of justice similar to, but more general than, the idea I call justice as fairness" (L.P. p. 3).

== The Society of Peoples ==
By 'peoples', Rawls means "the actors in the Society of Peoples, just as citizens are the actors in domestic society" (L.P. p. 23). Peoples share three features:

- a common system of government;
- what John Stuart Mill called "common sympathies"; and
- a moral nature.

Although the Law of Peoples is supposed to be part of liberal foreign policy, the peoples Rawls talks about are not necessarily liberal. 'Decent hierarchical peoples' also feature as parties to the Law of Peoples, though 'burdened societies', 'outlaw states' and 'benevolent absolutisms' do not. The inclusion of 'decent hierarchical peoples' is demanded by the notion of toleration, a notion Rawls sees as integral to liberalism. In part, the Law of Peoples is an attempt to show how far international toleration by liberal societies can reasonably be expected to extend.

By 'Law of Peoples', Rawls means "a particular political conception of right and justice that applies to the principles and norms of international law and practice" (L.P. p. 3). This political conception of justice is arrived at through the device of the 'original position' – a hypothetical arrangement whereby representatives of each of the peoples get together with the aim of determining principles that will govern the terms of their association. The principles yielded by this process make up the content of the Law of Peoples. Seven initial principles were set out in Rawls' 1993 essay, and an eighth principle was added in his 1999 edition:

1. Peoples (as organized by their governments) are free and independent, and their freedom and independence is to be respected by other peoples.
2. Peoples are equal and parties to their own agreements.
3. Peoples have the right of self-defense but no right to war.
4. Peoples are to observe a duty of non-intervention.
5. Peoples are to observe treaties and undertakings.
6. Peoples are to honor human rights.
7. Peoples are to observe certain specified restrictions on the conduct of war (assumed to be in self-defense).
8. Peoples have a duty to assist other peoples living under unfavorable conditions that prevent their having a just or decent political and social regime.

Rawls positions his approach as a "constructivist" one, contrasting this with other views of moral philosophy such as "rational intuitionism, (classical) utilitarianism, and perfectionism".

== Ideal vs nonideal theory ==
Much of Rawls' thesis belongs to Ideal Theory, i.e. it is an attempt to define how different peoples who are just, or at least decent, should behave with respect to one another. Rawls refers to this ideal conception as a "realistic utopia": realistic because it could and may exist; utopian because it "joins reasonableness and justice with conditions enabling citizens to realize their fundamental interests" (L.P. p. 7). This is a continuation of Jean-Jacques Rousseau's idea that any attempt to discover sure principles of government must take "men as they are and laws as they might be". Thus, the Law of Peoples is realistically utopian: it is an attempt to show "how reasonable citizens and peoples might live peacefully in a just world" (L.P., Preface, p.vi).

While Rawls focuses mainly on ideal theory, he does mention some aspects of nonideal theory, which involve considering the proper response to the fact that injustice exists. His 1993 article distinguishes between two kinds of nonideal theory: where nonliberal regimes choose not to comply with the reasonable conditions which he has argued as those proper to decent peoples, which would include fascist and dictatorial regimes, and peoples unable to comply with these reasonable conditions not through ill-will but because they lack the cultural traditions, human capital, skills and resources needed to realise the ideal conditions. The latter group might involve primitive societies and peoples continually disadvantaged by hostile climatic conditions: to these communities, decent peoples owe a duty to assist their development towards "conditions that make a well-ordered society possible".

However, in dealing with international relations the questions arising from the highly nonideal conditions of the real world with its great injustices and widespread social evils cannot be put aside. Thus Rawls considers how a "well ordered" people (liberal or decent) should behave towards outlaw or burdened societies that cannot be considered decent.

== Criticisms ==
It has been argued that a cosmopolitan interpretation of John Rawls‘ theory of justice as fairness is a more reasonable alternative to the application of The Law of Peoples at the global level. According to this view, an arbitrary limitation of the scope of applicability of justice as fairness is embodied in the specification of the conception of the person as a citizen and of society as a constitutional liberal democratic nation-state. Moreover, it is argued that the conception of toleration, on which these specifications of fundamental ideas into particular conceptions ultimately rely, is disanalogous between the domestic and international context and incompatible with the foundational commitments of a political theory of justice in The Law of Peoples.
