= Thomas E. Hill (academic) =

American professor of philosophy (born 1937)

- Born: Thomas English Hill Jr. 1937; Atlanta, Georgia, US
- Died: July 2026 (aged 88–89)

Education
- Doctoral advisor: John Rawls

Philosophical work
- Era: Contemporary philosophy
- Region: Western philosophy
- School: Analytic
- Main interests: Ethics; political philosophy; history of ethics; Immanuel Kant

Thomas English Hill Jr. (1937–2026) was an American philosopher who specialized in ethics, political philosophy, history of ethics and the work of Immanuel Kant. He was emeritus Kenan Professor of Philosophy at the University of North Carolina at Chapel Hill and a past president of the American Philosophical Association's Eastern Division.

== Life and career ==
Thomas E. Hill Jr. was born in Atlanta, Georgia. His father, also named Thomas E. Hill, was a moral philosopher who was deeply influenced by the work of G. E. Moore. Their family lived mainly in St. Paul, Minnesota, where Hill's father taught philosophy for many years at Macalester College. Hill received his B.A. from Harvard University in 1959. He was elected a Rhodes Scholar that year and subsequently completed a B.Phil. in philosophy at Oxford University in 1961, working with P. F. Strawson, Gilbert Ryle, J. O. Urmson and others. Hill returned to Harvard in 1962 for his Ph.D. in philosophy, which he completed under John Rawls in 1966. Hill first taught at Johns Hopkins University before moving to Pomona College in California. He joined the faculty at UCLA in 1968 where he taught until 1984, when he moved to the faculty at UNC Chapel Hill.

Hill is married to A. Robin Hill, who has an MSW from UNC Chapel Hill and works as a medical social worker. They live in Pittsboro, North Carolina. He and his first wife, Sharon Bishop, have two sons (Thomas Edward Hill and Kenneth James Hill). Sharon Bishop also received her PhD from Harvard, in 1968, and taught philosophy at California State University, Los Angeles.

Hill is a fellow of the American Academy of Arts and Sciences, and gave the Tanner Lectures on Human Values in 1994. He has won numerous teaching awards, including the UNC Distinguished Teaching Award for Post-Baccalaureate Instruction in 1998 and 2010.

== Philosophical work ==
Hill is best known for his work interpreting, explaining and extending Kant's moral and political philosophy. He emphasizes features of Kant's views that fit common moral understanding while separating out aspects of Kant's work that are more controversial. In his "The Kingdom of Ends" (1971), Hill highlights the Kingdom of Ends formulation of Kant's Categorical Imperative, which he interprets as a point of view for assessing mid-level moral rules and virtues that is similar in some ways to John Rawls' Original Position. As Hill interprets Kant In his “Humanity as an End in Itself" (1980), dignity is an incommensurable status that must be interpreted and applied through moral principles and virtues. Hill has made other contributions to Kant scholarship. In his article “The Hypothetical Imperative” (1973) he argues that Kant presupposes an unconditionally necessary (a priori) principle of practical reasoning that goes beyond morality but always leaves us with the option of abandoning our purposes rather than taking the necessary means to them. And in his “Kant’s Argument for the Rationality of Moral Conduct” (1985), Hill reconstructs the obscure and dismissed argument in Part III of Kant's Groundwork of the Metaphysic of Morals. His views on Kant are brought together in his introduction to the Groundwork of the Metaphysic of Morals (Oxford University Press, 2002).

In addition to his work on Kant, Hill has done work (mostly collected in his collection Autonomy and Self-Respect (Cambridge University Press, 1991) searching for and articulating the values we presuppose in our moral judgments on particular cases by focusing on realistic examples. He often suggests why familiar moral theories such as utilitarianism do not fully explain our grounds for these judgments and attempts to explain and partially defend the non-standard values we work from in everyday life. In his "Servility and Self-Respect" (1973) Hill explores the kinds of servile attitudes of those who have lost their self-respect. He makes a case for affirmative action in his "The Message of Affirmative Action" (1991) that is not exclusively focused on providing future benefits or righting past wrongs. And his "Ideals of Human Excellence and Preserving Natural Environments" (1983) addresses certain environmental issues by considering what kind of person would treat the environment in various ways instead of directly addressing the standard problems of cost-benefit analysis, the intrinsic value of nature and anthropocentrism.
