= Rainer Forst =

German philosopher (born 1964)

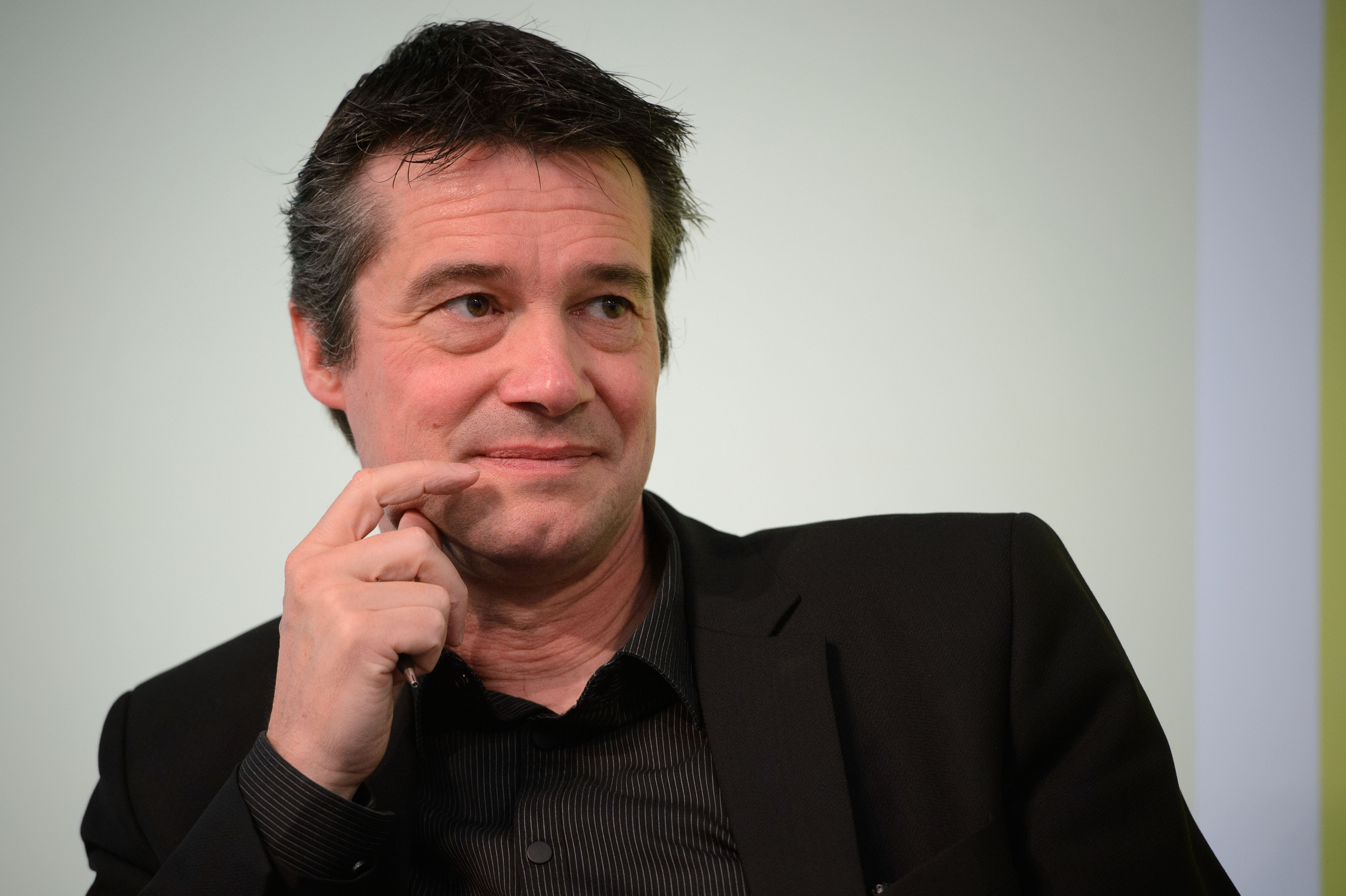
- Born: 15 August 1964 (age 62); Wiesbaden, West Germany

Education
- Education: Goethe University Frankfurt; Harvard University

Philosophical work
- Era: 21st century philosophy, Contemporary philosophy
- Region: Western philosophy
- School: Critical theory
- Main interests: Democracy; Toleration; Justice

Rainer Forst (born 15 August 1964) is a German philosopher and political theorist, and was called the "most important political philosopher of his generation" in 2012, when he won the Gottfried Wilhelm Leibniz Prize. Currently he is Professor of Political Theory at the Department for Social Sciences, Goethe University Frankfurt. He is often identified with the newest generation of scholars associated with the Frankfurt School of critical theory. He received his doctorate under the supervision of Jürgen Habermas in 1993, with additional supervision by John Rawls from 1991 to 1992. He is a member of the Committee on Social Thought at the University of Chicago.

His main areas of research are political theory, pragmatism, tolerance, and political and social justice. His first book in English, Contexts of Justice, incorporated elements of Anglo-American liberal theory and communitarianism with German critical and social theory. He is frequently recognized as perhaps the world's leading authority on the subject of toleration.

== Publications ==
=== In English ===
- 2002. Contexts of Justice, J. Farrell (trans.), Berkeley and Los Angeles: University of California Press.
- 2008. "Pierre Bayle's Reflexive Theory of Toleration", in M. Williams, J. Waldron (eds.), Toleration and its Limits (Nomos XLVIII), New York: New York University Press, 78–113.
- 2012. The Right to Justification: Elements of a Constructivist Theory of Justice, J. Flynn (trans.), A. Allen (ed.), New York: Columbia University Press.
- 2013. Toleration in Conflict: Past and Present, C. Cronin (trans.), Cambridge: Cambridge University Press.
- 2013. Justification and Critique: Towards a Critical Theory of Politics, C. Cronin (trans.), Cambridge: Polity Press.
- 2014. Justice, Democracy and the Right to Justification: Rainer Forst in Dialogue, London: Bloomsbury Academic.
- 2014. The Power of Tolerance, with Wendy Brown, New York: Columbia University Press.
- 2018. Normativity and Power, C. Cronin (trans.), Oxford: Oxford University Press.

=== In German ===
- Kontexte der Gerechtigkeit. Politische Philosophie jenseits von Liberalismus und Kommunitarismus. 1994, 1996 und 2004, Suhrkamp Verlag. English Title: Contexts of Justice. Political Philosophy beyond Liberalism and Communitarianism, John M. M. Farrell (trans.), Berkeley. Los Angeles: University of California Press, 2002.
- Toleranz. Philosophische Grundlagen und gesellschaftliche Praxis einer umstrittenen Tugend. 2000, Campus Verlag (Herausgeber). (In German)
- Toleranz im Konflikt. Geschichte, Gehalt und Gegenwart eines umstrittenen Begriffs. 2003, Suhrkamp Verlag. Toleration in Conflict: Past and Present, C. Cronin (trans.), Cambridge: Cambridge University Press.
- Das Recht auf Rechtfertigung. Elemente einer konstruktivistischen Theorie der Gerechtigkeit. 2007, Suhrkamp Verlag. English Title: The Right to Justification: Elements of a Constructivist Theory of Justice, J. Flynn (trans.), Columbia University Press, 2012.
- Kritik der Rechtfertigungsverhältnisse. Perspektiven einer kritischen Theorie der Politik. 2011, Suhrkamp Verlag. English Title: Justification and Critique.Towards a Critical Theory of Politics, trans. C. Cronin, Cambridge: Polity Press, 2013.
- Normativität und Macht. Zur Analyse sozialer Rechtfertigungsordnungen. 2015, Suhrkamp Verlag. English Title: Normativity and Power, Oxford: Oxford University Press, C. Cronin (trans.), 2018.
