= Primary goods =

Philosophical concept

Primary goods are presented in the book A Theory of Justice (1971) written by the American philosopher John Rawls. In the first edition of the Theory of Justice, these goods are supposed to be desirable for every rational human being, just as they are also useful for them. Thus, primary goods are the common base for the unanimous selection of the justice principle in the original position.

Primary goods are subdivided in two categories:

- Natural primary goods: this category includes intelligence, imagination, health, speed etc.
- Social primary goods: this category includes rights (civil rights and political rights), liberties, income and wealth, the social bases of self-respect, etc.

In the second edition of the Theory of Justice, primary goods are stated to be those that the citizens need as free people and as members of society.

== See also ==
- Utilitarianism
- Welfarism
