= Free and Equal (book) =

2023 book by Daniel Chandler

Free and Equal: What Would a Fair Society Look Like?
- Author: Daniel Chandler
- Language: English
- Subject: Political philosophy, economics
- Publisher: Allen Lane
- Publication date: 2023
- Publication place: United Kingdom
- Media type: Print (hardcover · paperback)
- Pages: 432
- ISBN: 9780141991948
- Dewey Decimal: 320.011

Free and Equal: What Would a Fair Society Look Like? is a 2023 book by Daniel Chandler, an economist and philosopher at the London School of Economics and former policy advisor, arguing for the revitalisation of modern liberalism based on the theories of John Rawls.

Chandler begins the book noting the growing discontent with liberal democracy and the neoliberal economic model, the rise in support for right-wing populism and the lack of an inspiring alternative vision for a fair society. The first part of the book summarises the theories of Rawls, primarily articulated in A Theory of Justice (1971), as well as debates with critics from various angles. The second part discusses how to address contemporary economic, political, social and environmental issues, using Rawls's theories as a framework. The 2024 edition has an afterword, in which Chandler discusses how such changes could be politically possible.

Stuart Jeffries of The Guardian called the book "a stirring call" and wrote that while its first part is "a fine elucidation of Rawls’s ideas and critical responses to them", he considered the second part to be "where things get exciting." In the LSE Review of Books, Aveek Bhattacharya, Research Director of the Social Market Foundation, called it "a book of two halves" and praised the first part, writing, "I would happily assign the book as reading if I were teaching Rawls to undergraduates." His opinion of the second part was more mixed, arguing that Chandler overlooks practical challenges and "fixates on Rawls when other political philosophers would be more helpful." Kirkus Reviews wrote, "Chandler brings good cheer and a positive outlook to the work of reshaping society, which marks an advance on the usual gloom and doom."
