= Arnold Davidson =

American academic (born 1955)

- Born: Arnold Ira Davidson; 1955 (age 70–71)

Education
- Education: Harvard University
- Doctoral advisor: John Rawls

Philosophical work
- Era: Contemporary philosophy
- Region: Western philosophy
- School: Continental philosophy

Arnold Ira Davidson (born 1955) is a philosopher who has taught in many different academic departments, and in many different countries. He is currently Distinguished Professor of Humanities at The Hebrew University of Jerusalem. He teaches in the Mandel School for Advanced Studies in the Humanities as well as in several departments, principally in the Department of Jewish Thought and the Department of Romance Studies.https://en.jewishthought.huji.ac.il/people/arnold-i-davidson

Davidson is also the Robert O. Anderson Distinguished Service Professor in Philosophy, Comparative Literature, History of Science, and Philosophy of Religion at the University of Chicago. He is also a member of the Committee on the Conceptual Foundations of Science at Chicago and was a professor at the Università di Pisa in Pisa, Italy.

In 2021, the French government promoted Davidson to the rank of Commandeur—the highest rank—in the order of knighthood of which he is a member, the Ordre des Palmes Académiques. This honor was conferred for his exceptional contribution to the teaching and promotion of French thought and culture.[Décret du 21 juillet 2021 portant promotion et nomination dans l'Ordre des Palmes académiques, NOR : MENB2117848D, Contingent des Étrangers; publié au BODMR n° 03 du 30 juillet 2021].

== Education and career ==
Davidson holds a Ph.D. from Harvard University, where he wrote a dissertation under the supervision of John Rawls and Stanley Cavell. He taught at Stanford University from 1981 to 1985, apart from a year as a visiting assistant professor at Princeton University in 1984–85. He joined the University of Chicago faculty in 1986. He is currently the Distinguished Professor of Humanities at the Hebrew University of Jerusalem.

Davidson, who often speaks and teaches at French and Italian universities, has been a fellow of the Wissenschaftskolleg in Berlin as well as visiting professor, chaire d'Etat, at the Collège de France. He was also the executive editor of the journal Critical Inquiry. Davidson was also a Guggenheim Fellowship recipient in 2003.

== Philosophical work ==
Davidson's scholarship concentrates in contemporary continental philosophy, moral philosophy, the history of theology, and historical epistemology, and the history of the human sciences. His publications (books, articles and essays) cover a wide array of ranging from the moral philosophy of Emmanuel Levinas, Vladimir Jankélévitch, and Pierre Hadot, to Georges Canguilhem's philosophy of science. Many of Davidson's publications are written in French and Italian and published by European presses.

Much of Davidson's scholarship focuses on the theory of Michel Foucault. Davidson is the editor of several books on or by Foucault including: Foucault and His Interlocutors, Society Must Be Defended, Abnormal, and The Hermeneutics of the Subject. In Davidson's most recent book, The Emergence of Sexuality: Historical Epistemology and the Formation of Concepts, he applies and develops Foucauldian archeological and genealogical methodological innovations in the development of a method he calls "Historical Epistemology". This work consists of essays on epistemology, the history of sexuality and scientific concepts, and the interpretation of Foucault.

== Bibliography ==
- A. I. Davidson: L'Emergence de la sexualité; épistémologie historique et formation des concepts; Albin Michel, 2005.
- A. I. Davidson: The Emergence of Sexuality: Historical Epistemology and the Formation of Concepts; Paperback, 2004.
- A. I. Davidson: La aparición de la sexualidad; Alpha Decay, 2004.
- A. I. Davidson: Foucault and His Interlocutors; Paperback, 1998.
- M. Foucault, A. I. Davidson, G. Burchell: Psychiatric Power: Lectures at the Collège de France 1973–1974; Hardcover, 2006.
- M. Foucault, A. I. Davidson, G. Burchell: The Hermeneutics of the Subject: Lectures at the Collège de France 1981–1982; Paperback, 2005.
- M. Foucault, A. I. Davidson: Abnormal: Lectures at the Collège de France, 1974–1975; Hardcover, 2003.
- W. J. T. Mitchell, A. I. Davidson: The late Derrida; Paperback, 2007.
- J. Chandler, A. I. Davidson, H. D. Harootunian: Questions of Evidence: Proof, Practice, and Persuasion across the Disciplines; Paperback, 1994.
- P. Hadot, A. I. Davidson: Philosophy As a Way of Life: Spiritual Exercises from Socrates to Foucault; Hardcover, 1995.
