= Overlapping consensus =

Concept in the philosophy of John Rawls

Overlapping consensus is a term coined by John Rawls in A Theory of Justice and developed in Political Liberalism. The term overlapping consensus refers to how supporters of different comprehensive normative doctrines—that entail apparently inconsistent conceptions of justice—can agree on particular principles of justice that underwrite a political community's basic social institutions. Comprehensive doctrines can include systems of religion, political ideology, or morality.

Rawls explains that an overlapping consensus on principles of justice can occur despite "considerable differences in citizens' conceptions of justice provided that these conceptions lead to similar political judgements." The groups are able to achieve this consensus in part by refraining from political/public disputes over fundamental (e.g. metaphysical) arguments regarding religion and philosophy. Rawls elaborates that the existence of an overlapping consensus on conceptions of justice among major social groups holding differing—yet reasonable—comprehensive doctrines is a necessary and distinctive characteristic of political liberalism. Rawls also explains that the overlapping consensus on principles of justice is itself a moral conception and is supported by moral reasoning—although the fundamental grounds of this support may differ for each of the various groups holding disparate comprehensive doctrines, and these lines of reasoning may also differ from the public reasons provided for supporting the principles. These latter features distinguish his idea of an overlapping consensus from a mere modus vivendi, which is a strategic agreement entered into for pragmatic purposes, and therefore potentially unprincipled and unstable. The overlapping consensus could in sum be said to "depend, in effect, on there being a morally significant core of commitments common to the 'reasonable' fragment of each of the main comprehensive doctrines in the community".

It has been argued that reasonable forms of religious and moral public education may be agreed by considering which common values and principles may be determined through overlapping consensus between those of otherwise incommensurable comprehensive doctrines (e.g. those of a given religion and secularists).

== See also ==
- Pluralism (political philosophy)
- Public choice
- Public reason
