= Telishment =

Telishment is an act by the authorities of punishing a suspect in order to deter future wrongdoers, even though they know that the suspect is innocent. If supporters of these theories believe in the effectiveness of telishment as a deterrent, opponents claim that they must bite the bullet and also hold that telishment is ethically justified.

== See also ==
- "The Ones Who Walk Away from Omelas"

== Sources ==
- Audi, Robert, ed. (1995). The Cambridge Dictionary of Philosophy. Cambridge; New York: Cambridge University Press. pp. 791–792. ISBN 0-521-40224-7.
- John Rawls, "Two Concepts of Rules", The Philosophical Review, vol. 64, no. 1, 1955, pp. 3–32.
