= Samuel Freeman (philosopher) =

Education
- Education: Harvard University; University of North Carolina at Chapel Hill
- Thesis: Contractarianism and fundamental rights (1985)
- Doctoral advisor: John Rawls

Philosophical work
- Region: Western philosophy
- Institutions: University of Pennsylvania
- Main interests: Legal philosophy

Samuel Freeman is an American philosopher, Avalon Professor of the Humanities and Professor of Philosophy and Law at the University of Pennsylvania. He is a leading authority on the philosophy of John Rawls and also writes in political and legal philosophy, from a Rawlsian perspective.

== Education and career ==
Freeman earned a J.D. from the University of North Carolina, Chapel Hill in 1977 and his Ph.D. in philosophy at Harvard University in 1985 under the supervision of John Rawls. He joined the Penn faculty that year.

He has published many articles on issues in moral, political and legal philosophy from a Rawlsian perspective, some of which are collected in his 2006 book Justice and the Social Contract. He is also a frequent contributor to The New York Review of Books.

In 2017, he was elected a Fellow of the American Academy of Arts and Sciences.

== Books ==
=== Authored ===
- Justice and the Social Contract: Essays on Rawlsian Political Philosophy (Oxford University Press, 2006)
- Rawls (Routledge, 2007)

=== Edited ===
- The Cambridge Companion to Rawls (Cambridge University Press, 2003)
- John Rawls, Lectures on the History of Political Philosophy (Harvard University Press, 2007)
