= Original position =

Thought experiment in political philosophy

Citizens make choices about their society from an "original position" of equality (left) behind a "veil of ignorance" (curtain, center), without knowing what gender, race, abilities, tastes, wealth, or position in society they will have (right). Philosopher John Rawls claims this will cause them to choose "fair" policies.

In philosophy, the original position is a hypothetical position from which members of society would consider which principles they would select for the basic structure of their society if they had no knowledge ahead of time regarding the position which they would end up occupying in that society. The idea of having no such knowledge, because everyone is behind a veil of ignorance, represents a thought experiment often associated with the work of the American philosopher John Rawls.

In this "original position", the "veil of ignorance" prevents everyone from knowing their ethnicity, social status, gender, and (crucially in Rawls's formulation) their or anyone else's ideas of how to lead a good life. Ideally, this would force participants acting rationally to adopt an "initial agreement" on the principles impartially.

In Rawls's theory the original position plays the same role as the "state of nature" does in the social contract tradition of Thomas Hobbes and John Locke. The original position figures prominently in Rawls's 1971 book, A Theory of Justice. It has influenced a variety of thinkers from a broad spectrum of philosophical orientations.

Rawls coined the phrases original position and veil of ignorance. However, the same thought experiment had already been described earlier in social choice by William Vickrey and John Harsanyi, who independently derived proofs showing a rational observer in the original position would adopt a utilitarian framework.

== History ==
The concept of the veil of ignorance has been in use by other names for centuries by philosophers such as John Stuart Mill and Immanuel Kant whose work discussed the concept of the social contract, Adam Smith with his "impartial spectator", or the ideal observer theory. John Harsanyi was the first to mathematically formalize the concept, using it to an argument in favor of utilitarianism rather than an argument for a social contract (as rational agents consider expected outcomes, not worst-case outcomes). The usage of the term by John Rawls was developed in his 1971 book A Theory of Justice.

Modern work tends to focus on the different decision theories that might describe the choice of the decision-maker "behind the veil". In addition, Michael Moehler has shown that, from a moral point of view, decision theory is not necessarily central to veil of ignorance arguments, but the precise moral ideals that are assumed to model the veil. From a moral point of view, there is not one veil of ignorance but many different versions of it.

== Nature of the concept ==
Rawls states that the parties in the original position are concerned with the distribution of primary social goods, including basic rights, liberties and certain social and economic advantages. He further argues that the representatives in the original position would adopt the maximin rule when evaluating alternative principles of justice. Derived from decision theory and game theory the maximin rule directs attention to the outcome for the least advantaged position. In Rawls's account this reasoning supports a conception of justice that gives particular consideration to the interests of the least advantaged members of society.

It has been argued that under the veil of ignorance the parties in the original position may adopt a cautious approach when choosing principles of justice. Because they do not know what position they will occupy in society, they may favor principles that secure the best possible outcome for the least advantaged members of society. This reasoning is associated with the maximin rule which evaluates alternatives by considering the outcome for the least advantaged position.

However, some scholars note that if the original position is formulated under risk neutrality rather than extreme risk aversion, the resulting principle shifts away from Rawls’s maximin approach and converges on a wealth-maximizing rule. In this respect, John Harsanyi’s analysis suggests that rational individuals, not knowing their future station but treating outcomes according to expected utility, would opt for maximizing average or total well-being. (See wealth maximization for further discussion of this approach.)

In social contract theory, citizens in a state of nature contract with each other to establish a state of civil society. For example, in the Lockean state of nature, the parties agree to establish a civil society in which the government has limited powers and the duty to protect the persons and property of citizens. In the original position, the representative parties select principles of justice that are to govern the basic structure of society. Rawls argues that the representative parties in the original position would select two principles of justice:

1. Each citizen is guaranteed a fully adequate scheme of basic liberties, which is compatible with the same scheme of liberties for all others;
2. Social and economic inequalities must satisfy two conditions:
  - to the greatest benefit of the least advantaged (the difference principle);
  - attached to positions and offices open to all.

Rawls returns to the concept of an original position in his The Law of Peoples (1999), where he speaks of "using the idea of the original position a second time" to show how representatives of "peoples" (a concept similar to states in Rawls's reasoning") would determine how liberal and otherwise "decent" peoples would relate to each other.

Thomas Nagel further discussed the concept of the original position, emphasizing the relationship between the impartial perspective represented by the original position and the circumstances of actual individuals in society.

The original position has been modeled mathematically along Wright-Fisher's diffusion, classical in population genetics. The original position has also been used as an argument for negative eugenics, though Rawls's argument was limited to its use as a preventative measure.

== Criticisms ==
In Anarchy, State, and Utopia (1974), Robert Nozick argues that, while the original position may be the just starting point, any inequalities derived from that distribution by means of free exchange are equally just, and that any re-distributive tax is an infringement on people's liberty. He also argues that Rawls's application of the maximin rule to the original position is risk aversion taken to its extreme, and is therefore unsuitable even to those behind the veil of ignorance.

In Liberalism and the Limits of Justice (1982), Michael Sandel has criticized Rawls's notion of a veil of ignorance, pointing out that it is impossible, for an individual, to completely prescind from beliefs and convictions (from the Me ultimately), as is required by Rawls's thought experiment.

In a 1987 empirical research study, Frohlich, Oppenheimer, and Eavey showed that, in a simulated original position, undergraduates at American universities agreed upon a distributive principle that maximizes the average with a specified floor constraint (a minimum for the worst-off in any given distribution) over maximizing the floor alone or the average alone. While Rawls had argued that individuals in the original position would unanimously choose to maximize the welfare of the worst off, this principle of distribution was by far the least popular choice in the survey and was the preferred choice of less than 5% of participants.

In How to Make Good Decisions and Be Right All the Time (2008), Iain King argues that people in the original position should not be risk-averse, leading them to adopt the Help Principle (help someone if your help is worth more to them than it is to you) rather than maximin.

Philosopher and Law Professor Harold Anthony Lloyd argues that Rawls's veil of ignorance is hardly hypothetical but instead dangerously real since individuals cannot know at any point in time the future either for themselves or for others (or in fact know all aspects of either their relevant past or present). Faced with the high stakes of such ignorance, careful egoism effectively becomes altruism by minimizing/sharing risk through social safety nets and other means such as insurance.

== See also ==
- Bayesian probability
- Justice as Fairness: A Restatement
- Divide and choose
- Pie rule
- Tabula rasa
- Counterfactual
