= John Rawls =

American philosopher (1921–2002)

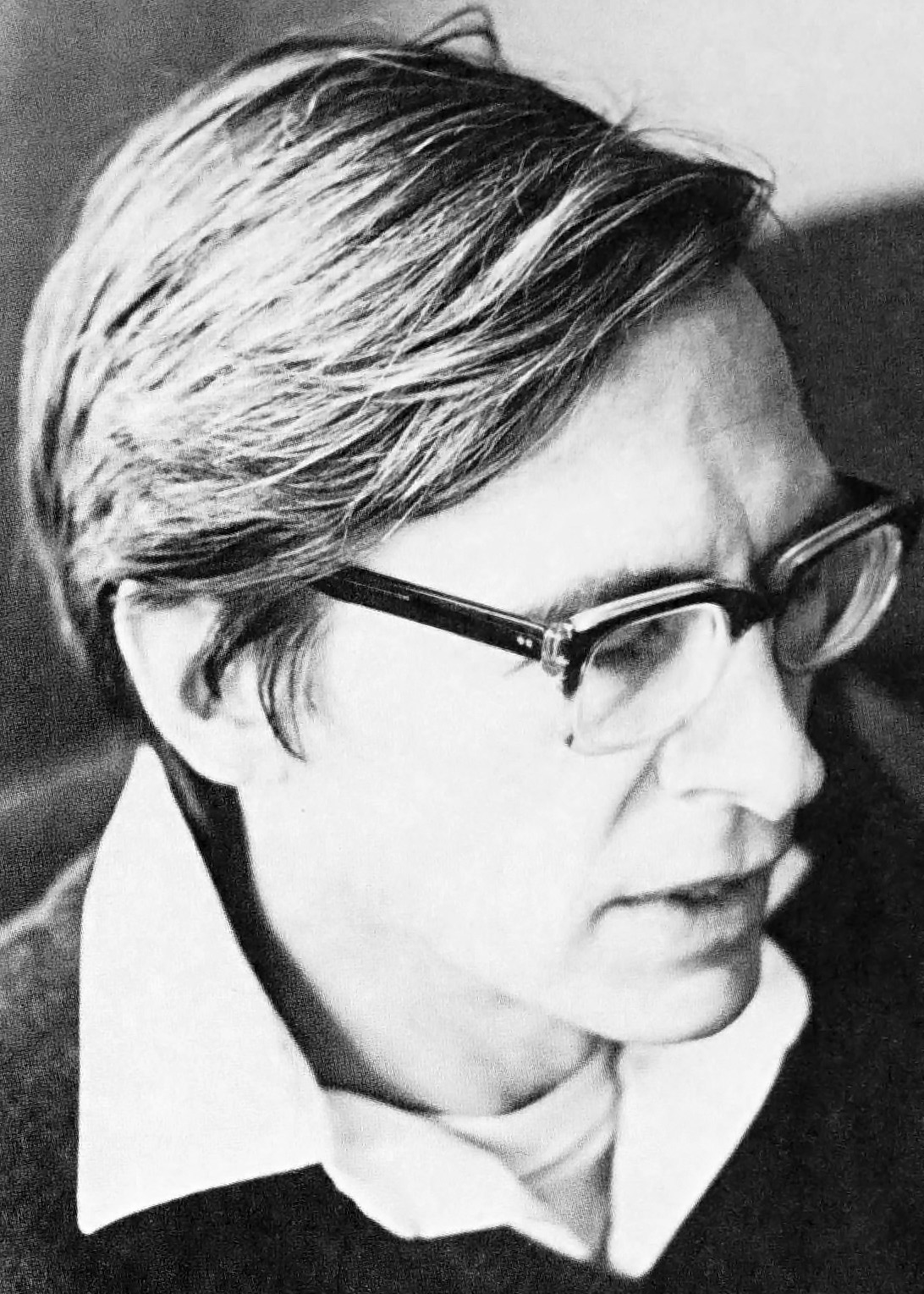
- Rawls in 1971
- Born: John Bordley Rawls; February 21, 1921; Baltimore, Maryland, U.S.
- Died: November 24, 2002 (aged 81); Lexington, Massachusetts, U.S.
- Spouse: Margaret Warfield Fox (m. 1949)
- Awards: Rolf Schock Prize in Logic and Philosophy (1999); National Humanities Medal (1999)

Education
- Education: Princeton University (BA, PhD); Christ Church, Oxford
- Thesis: A Study in the Grounds of Ethical Knowledge (1950)
- Doctoral advisor: Walter Terence Stace
- Other advisor: Norman Malcolm

Philosophical work
- Era: Contemporary philosophy
- Region: Western philosophy
- School: Analytic philosophy; Social liberalism
- Institutions: Princeton University; Cornell University; Harvard University
- Doctoral students: See list: Elizabeth S. Anderson; Hilary Bok; Claudia Card; Joshua Cohen; Arnold Davidson; Samuel Freeman; Hannah Ginsborg; Allan Gibbard; Jean Elizabeth Hampton; Barbara Herman; Thomas E. Hill Jr.; Christine Korsgaard; Michele Moody-Adams; Thomas Nagel; Susan Neiman; Onora O'Neill; Adrian Piper; Thomas Pogge; Henry S. Richardson; Michael Stocker; Andreas Teuber
- Notable students: See list: Sissela Bok; Gurcharan Das; David Lyons; T. M. Scanlon; Nancy Sherman; Daniel Weinstock
- Main interests: Political philosophy; Social contract theory; Democracy; Political legitimacy; Instrumental and value rationality
- Notable works: A Theory of Justice (1971); Political Liberalism (1993)
- Notable ideas: Justice as fairness; Original position; Reflective equilibrium; Overlapping consensus; Property-owning democracy; Public reason; Liberal neutrality; Veil of ignorance; Deliberative democracy; Liberal socialism; Primary goods; Telishment

John Bordley Rawls (/rɔːlz/; February 21, 1921 – November 24, 2002) was an American philosopher, most active in moral, legal, and political philosophy. Rawls has been described as one of the most influential modern liberal political philosophers of the 20th century.

In 1990, Will Kymlicka wrote in his introduction to the field that "it is generally accepted that the recent rebirth of normative political philosophy began with the publication of John Rawls's A Theory of Justice in 1971". Rawls's theory of "justice as fairness" recommends equal basic liberties, equality of opportunity, and facilitating the maximum benefit to the least advantaged members of society in any case where inequalities may occur. His argument for these principles of social justice uses a thought experiment called the "original position", in which people deliberatively select what kind of society they would choose to live in if they did not know which social position they would personally occupy. In his later work Political Liberalism (1993), he addresses the question of how political power can be exercised legitimately in a society where citizens hold diverse and often conflicting moral, religious, and philosophical points of view.

Rawls received both the Schock Prize for Logic and Philosophy and the National Humanities Medal in 1999. The latter was presented by President Bill Clinton in recognition of how his works "revived the disciplines of political and ethical philosophy with his argument that a society in which the most fortunate help the least fortunate is not only a moral society but a logical one".

Among contemporary political philosophers, Rawls is with some frequency mentioned by the courts of law in the United States and Canada and referred to by practicing politicians in the United States and the United Kingdom. In a 2008 national survey of political theorists, based on 1,086 responses from professors at accredited, four-year colleges and universities in the United States, Rawls was voted first on the list of "Scholars Who Have Had the Greatest Impact on Political Theory in the Past 20 Years".

== Biography ==
=== Early life and education ===
Rawls was born on February 21, 1921, in Baltimore, Maryland, the second of five sons. His father, William Lee Rawls, was a prominent Baltimore attorney, and his mother, Anna Abell Stump Rawls, was active in local Democratic politics, including advocacy for women's voting rights. Tragedy struck Rawls at a young age:

Two of his brothers died in childhood because they had contracted fatal illnesses from him. ... In 1928, the seven-year-old Rawls contracted diphtheria. His brother Bobby, younger by 20 months, visited him in his room and was fatally infected. The next winter, Rawls contracted pneumonia. Another younger brother, Tommy, caught the illness from him and died.

Rawls's biographer Thomas Pogge calls the loss of the brothers the "most important events in John's childhood".

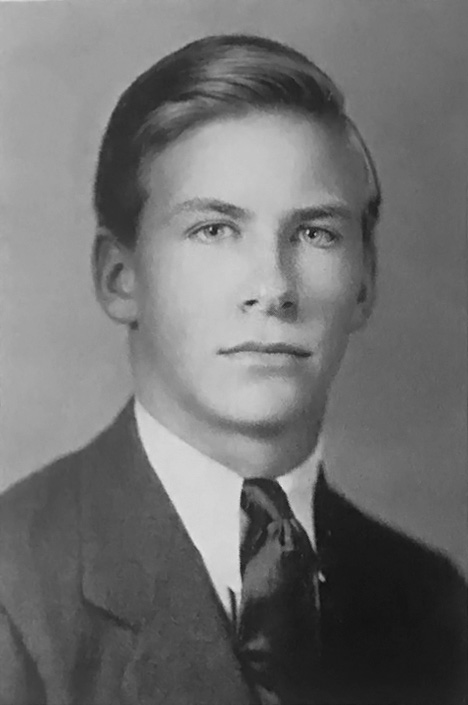
Rawls as a Kent School senior, 1937

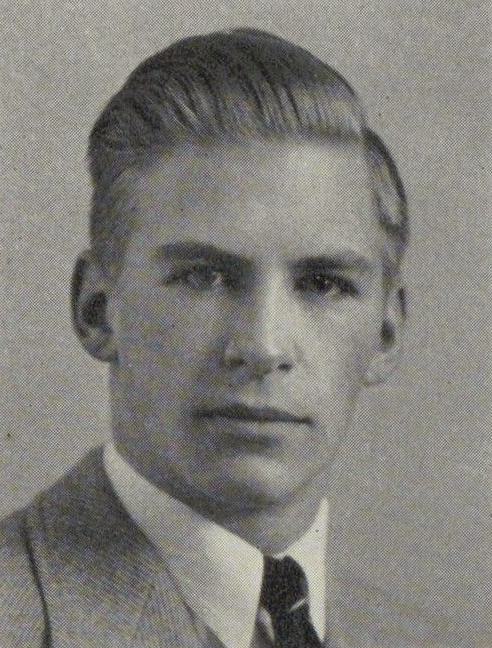
Rawls in the Princeton University yearbook, 1943

Rawls graduated in Baltimore before enrolling in the Kent School, an Episcopal preparatory school in Connecticut. Upon graduation in 1939, Rawls attended Princeton University, where he was accepted into the Ivy Club and the American Whig–Cliosophic Society. At Princeton, Rawls was influenced by Norman Malcolm, Ludwig Wittgenstein's student. During his last two years at Princeton, he "became deeply concerned with theology and its doctrines". He considered attending a seminary to study for the Episcopal priesthood and wrote an "intensely religious senior thesis (BI)". In his 181-page long thesis titled "Meaning of Sin and Faith", Rawls attacked Pelagianism because it "would render the Cross of Christ to no effect". Rawls graduated from Princeton in 1943 with a Bachelor of Arts, summa cum laude.

In early 1946, Rawls returned to Princeton to pursue a doctorate in moral philosophy. He married Margaret Warfield Fox, a Brown University graduate, in 1949. They had four children: Anne Warfield, Robert Lee, Alexander Emory, and Elizabeth Fox.

Rawls received his PhD from Princeton's philosophy department in 1950 after completing a doctoral dissertation titled A Study in the Grounds of Ethical Knowledge: Considered with Reference to Judgments on the Moral Worth of Character. His PhD included a year of study at Cornell. Rawls taught at Princeton until 1952 when he received a Fulbright Fellowship to Christ Church at Oxford University, where he was influenced by the liberal political theorist and historian Isaiah Berlin and the legal theorist H. L. A. Hart.

=== U.S. Army service (1943–1946) ===
Rawls enlisted in the U.S. Army in February 1943. During World War II, Rawls served as an infantryman in the Pacific with the 128th Infantry Regiment of the 32nd Infantry Division, where he served a tour of duty in New Guinea and was awarded a Combat Infantryman Badge and Bronze Star; and the Philippines, where he endured intensive trench warfare and witnessed traumatizing scenes of violence and bloodshed. It was there that he lost his Christian faith.

Following the surrender of Japan, Rawls became part of General MacArthur's occupying army and was promoted to sergeant. But he became disillusioned with the military when he saw the aftermath of the atomic blast in Hiroshima. Rawls later refused an order to discipline a fellow soldier, "believing no punishment was justified", and was "demoted back to a private". By January 1946, Rawls was disenchanted with the Army and left military service.

=== Professorship ===
After returning to the United States, in the fall of 1953, Rawls became an assistant professor at Cornell University, joining his mentor Norman Malcolm in the philosophy department. Three years later Rawls received tenure at Cornell. During the 1959–60 academic year he was a visiting professor at Harvard University, and he was appointed in 1960 as a professor in the humanities division at MIT. In 1962, he achieved a tenured position at MIT.

Later in 1962, he moved to Harvard, where he taught as a professor of philosophy until 1994. While tenured at Harvard, he trained some of the leading contemporary figures in moral and political philosophy, including Sibyl A. Schwarzenbach, Thomas Nagel, Allan Gibbard, Onora O'Neill, Adrian Piper, Arnold Davidson, Elizabeth S. Anderson, Christine Korsgaard, Susan Neiman, Claudia Card, Rainer Forst, Thomas Pogge, T. M. Scanlon, Barbara Herman, Joshua Cohen, Thomas E. Hill Jr., Gurcharan Das, Andreas Teuber, Henry S. Richardson, Nancy Sherman, Samuel Freeman and Paul Weithman. He held the James Bryant Conant University Professorship at Harvard. He remained there until reaching mandatory retirement age in 1991.

Rawls was, for a time, a member of the Mont Pèlerin Society. He was put forward for membership by Milton Friedman in 1968, and withdrew from the society three years later, just before his A Theory of Justice was published.

=== Later life ===
Rawls rarely gave interviews and, having both a stutter (which he attributed to the deaths of two of his brothers, who died through infections contracted from Rawls) and a "bat-like horror of the limelight", did not become a public intellectual despite his fame. He instead remained committed mainly to his academic and family life.

In 1995, he had the first of several strokes, severely impeding his ability to continue to work. He was nevertheless able to complete The Law of Peoples, the most complete statement of his views on international justice. Published in 2001 shortly before his death was Justice as Fairness: A Restatement, a response to criticisms of A Theory of Justice.

=== Death ===
Rawls died from heart failure at his home in Lexington, Massachusetts, on November 24, 2002, at age 81. He was buried at the Mount Auburn Cemetery in Massachusetts.

== Philosophy ==
Rawls published three main books. The first, A Theory of Justice, focused on distributive justice and attempted to reconcile the competing claims of the values of freedom and equality. The second, Political Liberalism, addressed the question of how citizens divided by intractable religious and philosophical disagreements could come to endorse a constitutional democratic regime. The third, The Law of Peoples, focused on the issue of global justice.

=== A Theory of Justice ===
A Theory of Justice, published in 1971, aimed to resolve the seemingly competing claims of freedom and equality. The shape Rawls's resolution took, however, was not that of a balancing act that compromised or weakened the moral claim of one value compared with the other. Rather, his intent was to show that notions of freedom and equality could be integrated into a seamless unity he called justice as fairness. By attempting to enhance the perspective which his readers should take when thinking about justice, Rawls hoped to show that conflict between freedom and equality is illusory.

Rawls's A Theory of Justice (1971) includes a thought experiment he called the "original position". The intuition behind it is that political philosophy will be greatly benefited by a specification of the correct standpoint a person should take in their thinking about justice. When we think about what a just state of affairs between persons would mean, we eliminate certain features such as hair or eye color, height, or race, and focus upon others. Rawls's original position is meant to encode our intuitions about which features are relevant, and which are irrelevant, for the purposes of deliberating well about justice.

The original position is Rawls's hypothetical scenario in which a group of persons is set the task of reaching an agreement about the kind of political and economic structure they want for a society, which they will then occupy. Each individual, however, deliberates behind a "veil of ignorance": each lacks knowledge, for example, of their gender, race, age, intelligence, wealth, skills, education, religion, and disability status. The only thing that a given member knows about themselves is that they are in possession of the basic capacities necessary to fully participate in an enduring system of mutual cooperation; each knows they can be a member of the society.

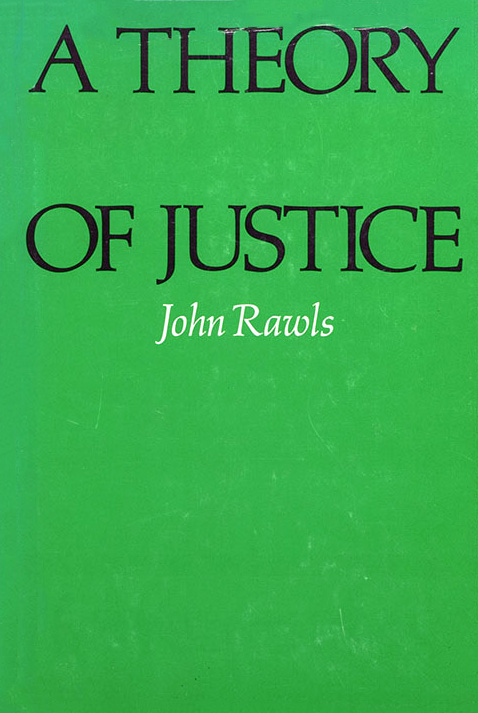
A Theory of Justice, 1st ed.

Visual illustration of the "original position" and "veil of ignorance"

Citizens making choices about their society are asked to make them from an "original position" of equality (at left) behind a "veil of ignorance" (curtain, center), without knowing what gender, race, abilities, tastes, wealth, or position in society they will have (at right). Rawls claims this will cause them to choose "fair" policies.

Rawls posits two basic capacities that the individuals would know they possess. First, individuals know that they have the capacity to form, pursue and revise a conception of the good, or life plan. Exactly what sort of conception of the good this is, however, the individual does not yet know. It may be, for example, religious or secular, but at the start, the individual in the original position does not know which. Second, each individual understands that they have the capacity to develop a sense of justice and a generally effective desire to abide by it. Knowing only these two features of themselves, the group will deliberate in order to design a social structure, during which each person will seek their maximum advantage. The idea is that proposals that we would ordinarily think of as unjust—such as that black people or women should not be allowed to hold public office—will not be proposed in this, Rawls's original position, because it would be irrational to propose them. The reason is simple: one does not know whether he himself would be a woman or a black person. This position is expressed in the difference principle, according to which, in a system of ignorance about one's status, one would strive to improve the position of the worst off, because he might find himself in that position.

Rawls develops his original position by modeling it, in certain respects at least, after the "initial situations" of various social contract thinkers who came before him, including Thomas Hobbes, John Locke and Jean-Jacques Rousseau. Each social contractarian constructs their initial situation somewhat differently, having in mind a unique political morality they intend the thought experiment to generate. Iain King has suggested that the original position draws on Rawls's experiences in post-war Japan, where the Allied Occupation authorities were challenged with designing new social and political arrangements for the country while "imagining away all that had gone before".

In social justice processes, each person early on makes decisions about which features of persons to consider and which to ignore. Rawls's aspiration is to have created a thought experiment whereby a version of that process is carried to its completion, illuminating the correct standpoint that a person should take in their thinking about justice. If he has succeeded, then the original position thought experiment may function as a full specification of the moral standpoint we should attempt to achieve when deliberating about social justice.

In setting out his theory, Rawls described his method as one of "reflective equilibrium", a concept which has since been used in other areas of philosophy. Reflective equilibrium is achieved by mutually adjusting one's general principles and one's considered judgements on particular cases, to bring the two into line with one another.

==== Principles of justice ====
Rawls derives two principles of justice from the original position. The first of these is the Liberty Principle, which establishes equal basic liberties for all citizens. 'Basic' liberty entails the freedoms of conscience, association and expression as well as democratic rights; Rawls also includes a personal property right, but this is defended in terms of moral capacities and self-respect, rather than an appeal to a natural right of self-ownership (this distinguishes Rawls's account from the classical liberalism of John Locke and the libertarianism of Robert Nozick).

Rawls argues that a second principle of equality would be agreed upon to guarantee liberties that represent meaningful options for all in society and ensure distributive justice. For example, formal guarantees of political voice and freedom of assembly are of little real worth to the desperately poor and marginalized in society. Demanding that everyone have exactly the same effective opportunities in life would almost certainly offend the very liberties that are supposedly being equalized. Nonetheless, we would want to ensure at least the "fair worth" of our liberties: wherever one ends up in society, one wants life to be worth living, with enough effective freedom to pursue personal goals. Thus, participants would be moved to affirm a two-part second principle comprising Fair Equality of Opportunity and difference principle. This second principle ensures that those with comparable talents and motivation face roughly similar life chances, and that inequalities in society work to the benefit of the least advantaged.

Rawls held that these principles of justice apply to the "basic structure" of fundamental social institutions such as the judiciary, the economic structure and the political constitution, a qualification that has been the source of some controversy and constructive debate (see the work of Gerald Cohen). Rawls's theory of justice stakes out the task of equalizing the distribution of primary social goods to those least advantaged in society and thus may be seen as a largely political answer to the question of justice, with matters of morality somewhat conflated into a political account of justice and just institutions. Relational approaches to the question of justice, by contrast, seek to examine the connections between individuals and focuses on their relations in societies, with respect to how these relationships are established and configured.

Rawls further argued that these principles were to be 'lexically ordered' to award priority to basic liberties over the more equality-oriented demands of the second principle. This has also been a topic of much debate among moral and political philosophers.

Finally, Rawls maintained that his theory applies primarily to a "well-ordered society ... designed to advance the good of its members and effectively regulated by a public conception of justice". In this respect, he understood justice as fairness as a contribution to "ideal theory", the determination of "principles that characterize a well-ordered society under favorable circumstances".

=== Political Liberalism ===
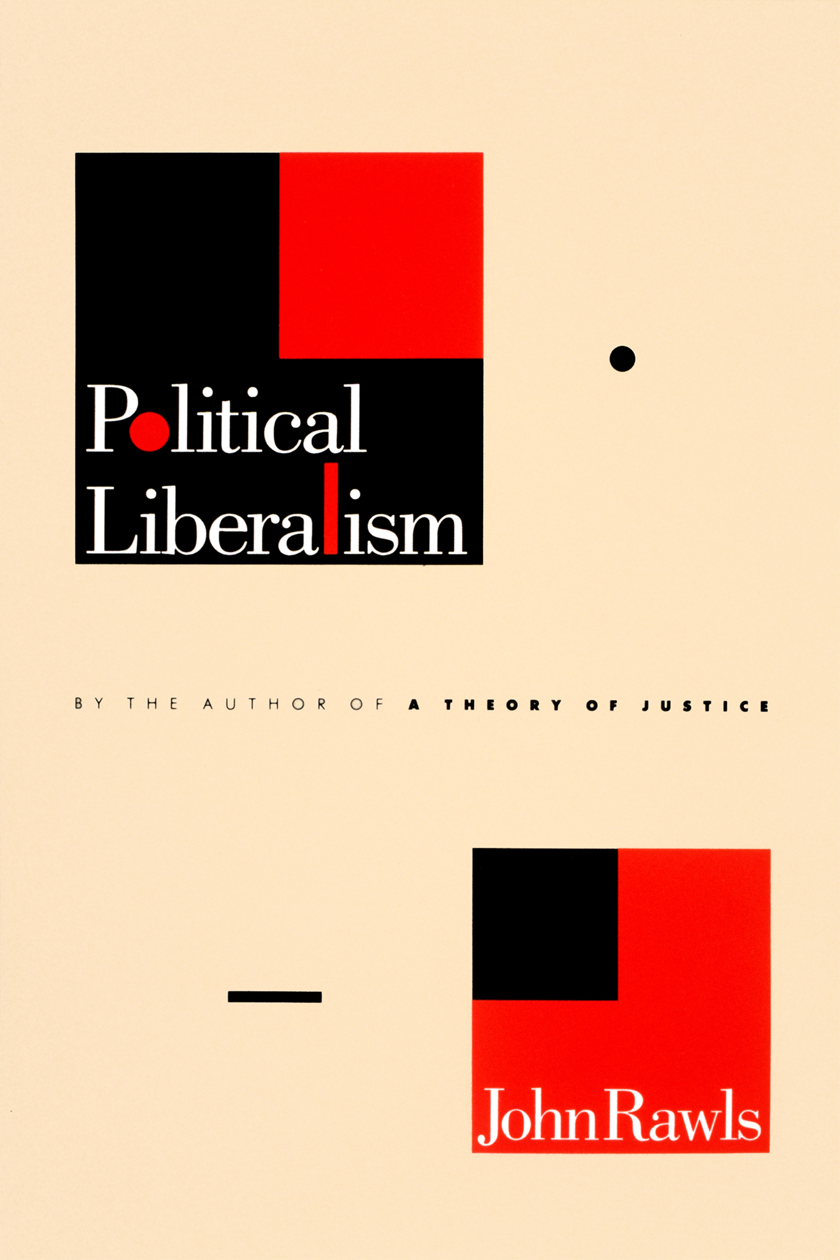
First edition of Political Liberalism

In Political Liberalism (1993), Rawls turned towards the question of political legitimacy in the context of intractable philosophical, religious, and moral disagreement amongst citizens regarding the human good. Such disagreement, he insisted, was reasonable—the result of the free exercise of human rationality under the conditions of open enquiry and free conscience that the liberal state is designed to safeguard. The question of legitimacy in the face of reasonable disagreement was urgent for Rawls because his own justification of Justice as Fairness relied upon a Kantian conception of the human good that can be reasonably rejected. If the political conception offered in A Theory of Justice can only be shown to be good by invoking a controversial conception of human flourishing, it is unclear how a liberal state ordered according to it could possibly be legitimate.

The intuition animating this seemingly new concern is actually no different from the guiding idea of A Theory of Justice, namely that the fundamental charter of a society must rely only on principles, arguments and reasons that cannot be reasonably rejected by the citizens whose lives will be limited by its social, legal, and political circumscriptions. In other words, the legitimacy of a law is contingent upon its justification being impossible to reasonably reject. This old insight took on a new shape, however, when Rawls realized that its application must extend to the deep justification of Justice as Fairness itself, which he had presented in terms of a reasonably rejectable (Kantian) conception of human flourishing as the free development of autonomous moral agency.

The core of Political Liberalism is its insistence that in order to retain its legitimacy, the liberal state must commit itself to the "ideal of public reason". This roughly means that citizens in their public capacity must engage one another only in terms of reasons whose status as reasons is shared between them. Political reasoning, then, is to proceed purely in terms of "public reasons". For example: a Supreme Court justice deliberating on whether or not the denial to homosexuals of the ability to marry constitutes a violation of the 14th Amendment's Equal Protection Clause may not advert to his religious convictions on the matter, but he may take into account the argument that a same-sex household provides sub-optimal conditions for a child's development. This is because reasons based upon the interpretation of sacred text are non-public (their force as reasons relies upon faith commitments that can be reasonably rejected), whereas reasons that rely upon the value of providing children with environments in which they may develop optimally are public reasons—their status as reasons draws upon no deep, controversial conception of human flourishing.

Rawls held that the duty of civility—the duty of citizens to offer one another reasons that are mutually understood as reasons—applies within what he called the "public political forum". This forum extends from the upper reaches of government—for example the supreme legislative and judicial bodies of the society—all the way down to the deliberations of a citizen deciding for whom to vote in state legislatures or how to vote in public referendums. Campaigning politicians should also, he believed, refrain from pandering to the non-public religious or moral convictions of their constituencies.

The ideal of public reason secures the dominance of the public political values—freedom, equality, and fairness—that serve as the foundation of the liberal state. But what about the justification of these values? Since any such justification would necessarily draw upon deep (religious or moral) metaphysical commitments which would be reasonably rejectable, Rawls held that the public political values may only be justified privately by individual citizens. The public liberal political conception and its attendant values may and will be affirmed publicly (in judicial opinions and presidential addresses, for example) but its deep justifications will not. The task of justification falls to what Rawls called the "reasonable comprehensive doctrines" and the citizens who subscribe to them. A reasonable Catholic will justify the liberal values one way, a reasonable Muslim another, and a reasonable secular citizen yet another way. One may illustrate Rawls's idea using a Venn diagram: the public political values will be the shared space upon which overlap numerous reasonable comprehensive doctrines. Rawls's account of stability presented in A Theory of Justice is a detailed portrait of the compatibility of one—Kantian—comprehensive doctrine with justice as fairness. His hope is that similar accounts may be presented for many other comprehensive doctrines. This is Rawls's famous notion of an "overlapping consensus".

Such a consensus would necessarily exclude some doctrines, namely, those that are "unreasonable", and so one may wonder what Rawls has to say about such doctrines. An unreasonable comprehensive doctrine is unreasonable in the sense that it is incompatible with the duty of civility. This is simply another way of saying that an unreasonable doctrine is incompatible with the fundamental political values a liberal theory of justice is designed to safeguard—freedom, equality and fairness. So one answer to the question of what Rawls has to say about such doctrines is—nothing. For one thing, the liberal state cannot justify itself to individuals (such as religious fundamentalists) who hold to such doctrines, because any such justification would—as has been noted—proceed in terms of controversial moral or religious commitments that are excluded from the public political forum. But, more importantly, the goal of the Rawlsian project is primarily to determine whether or not the liberal conception of political legitimacy is internally coherent, and this project is carried out by the specification of what sorts of reasons persons committed to liberal values are permitted to use in their dialogue, deliberations and arguments with one another about political matters. The Rawlsian project has this goal to the exclusion of concern with justifying liberal values to those not already committed—or at least open—to them. Rawls's concern is with whether or not the idea of political legitimacy fleshed out in terms of the duty of civility and mutual justification can serve as a viable form of public discourse in the face of the religious and moral pluralism of modern democratic society, not with justifying this conception of political legitimacy in the first place.

Rawls later revised the principles of justice as follows, giving priority to the first principle over the second, and to the first part of the second principle over the second part:

1. Each person has an equal claim to a fully adequate scheme of basic rights and liberties, which scheme is compatible with the same scheme for all; and in this scheme the equal political liberties, and only those liberties, are to be guaranteed their fair value.
2. Social and economic inequalities are to satisfy two conditions: first, they are to be attached to positions and offices open to all under conditions of fair equality of opportunity; and second, they are to be to the greatest benefit of the least advantaged members of society.

These principles are subtly modified from the principles in Theory. The first principle now reads "equal claim" instead of "equal right", and he also replaces the phrase "system of basic liberties" with "a fully adequate scheme of equal basic rights and liberties". The two parts of the second principle are also switched, so that the difference principle becomes the latter of the three.

=== The Law of Peoples ===
The Law of Peoples is Rawls' work on international relations. First published in 1993 as a short article, or "a sketch", in 1999 it was expanded and joined with another essay, "The Idea of Public Reason Revisited" to form a full-length book.

By 'Law of Peoples', Rawls means "a particular political conception of right and justice that applies to the principles and norms of international law and practice" (L.P. p. 3). This political conception of justice is arrived at through the device of the 'original position' – a hypothetical arrangement whereby representatives of each of the peoples get together with the aim of determining principles that will govern the terms of their association. The principles yielded by this process make up the content of the Law of Peoples. Seven initial principles were set out in Rawls' 1993 essay, and an eighth principle was added in his 1999 edition:

1. Peoples (as organized by their governments) are free and independent, and their freedom and independence is to be respected by other peoples.
2. Peoples are equal and parties to their own agreements.
3. Peoples have the right of self-defense but no right to war.
4. Peoples are to observe a duty of non-intervention.
5. Peoples are to observe treaties and undertakings.
6. Peoples are to honor human rights.
7. Peoples are to observe certain specified restrictions on the conduct of war (assumed to be in self-defense).
8. Peoples have a duty to assist other peoples living under unfavorable conditions that prevent their having a just or decent political and social regime.

It has been argued that a cosmopolitan interpretation of John Rawls‘ theory of justice as fairness is a more reasonable alternative to the application of The Law of Peoples at the global level. According to this view, an arbitrary limitation of the scope of applicability of justice as fairness is embodied in the specification of the conception of the person as a citizen and of society as a constitutional liberal democratic nation-state. Moreover, it is argued that the conception of toleration, on which these specifications of fundamental ideas into particular conceptions ultimately rely, is disanalogous between the domestic and international context and incompatible with the foundational commitments of a political theory of justice in The Law of Peoples.

=== Reception ===
Despite the exacting, academic tone of Rawls's writing and his reclusive personality, his philosophical work has exerted an enormous impact on not only contemporary moral and political philosophy but also public political discourse. During the student protests at Tiananmen Square in 1989, copies of A Theory of Justice were brandished by protesters in the face of government officials. Despite being approximately 600 pages long, over 300,000 copies of that book have been sold, stimulating critical responses from utilitarian, feminist, conservative, libertarian, Catholic, communitarian, Marxist and Green scholars.

Although having a profound influence on theories of distributive justice both in theory and in practice, the generally anti-meritocratic sentiment of Rawls's thinking has not been widely accepted by the political left. He consistently held the view that naturally developed skills and endowments could not be neatly distinguished from inherited ones, and that neither could be used to justify moral desert. Instead, he held the view that individuals could "legitimately expect" entitlements to the earning of income or development of abilities based on institutional arrangements. This aspect of Rawls's work has been instrumental in the development of such ideas as luck egalitarianism and unconditional basic income, which have themselves been criticized. The strictly egalitarian quality of Rawls's second principle of justice has called into question the type of equality that fair societies ought to embody.

==== Criticism of Theory of Justice ====
A Theory of Justice received criticism from several philosophers. Robert Nozick criticized Rawls' account of distributive justice in his defense of libertarianism, Anarchy, State, and Utopia (1974). Allan Bloom, writing in American Political Science Review in 1975, noted that A Theory of Justice had "attracted more attention in the Anglo-Saxon world than any work of its kind in a generation", attributing its popularity to its being "the most ambitious political project undertaken by a member of the school currently dominant in academic philosophy" and to Rawls’s "radical egalitarian interpretation of liberal democracy." Bloom criticized Rawls for failing to account for the existence of natural right in his theory of justice and wrote that Rawls absolutizes social union as the ultimate goal which would conventionalize everything into artifice. Robert Paul Wolff criticized Rawls from a Marxist perspective in Understanding Rawls: A Critique and Reconstruction of A Theory of Justice (1977), arguing Rawls offers an apology for the status quo insofar as he constructs justice from existing practice and forecloses the possibility that there may be problems of injustice embedded in capitalist social relations, private property or the market economy.

==== Communitarian critique ====
Charles Taylor, Alasdair Macintyre, Michael Sandel, and Michael Walzer produced a range of critical responses contesting the universalist basis of Rawls's original position. While these criticisms, which emphasize the cultural and social roots of normative political principles, are typically described as communitarian critiques of Rawlsian liberalism, none of their authors identified with philosophical communitarianism. In his later works, Rawls attempted to reconcile his theory of justice with the possibility that its normative foundations may not be universally applicable.

==== September Group ====
The late philosopher G. A. Cohen, along with political scientist Jon Elster, and John Roemer, used Rawls's writings extensively to inaugurate the Analytical Marxism movement in the 1980s.

==== Frankfurt School ====
In the later part of Rawls's career, he engaged with the scholarly work of Jürgen Habermas (see Habermas–Rawls debate). Habermas's reading of Rawls led to an appreciation of Rawls's work and other analytical philosophers by the Frankfurt School of critical theory, and many of Habermas's own students and associates were expected to be familiar with Rawls by the late 1980s. The Leibniz Prize–winning political philosopher Rainer Forst was advised by both Rawls and Habermas in completing his PhD. Axel Honneth, Fabian Freyenhagen, and James Gordon Finlayson have also drawn on Rawls's work in comparison to Habermas.

==== Feminist political philosophy ====
Philosopher Eva Kittay has extended the work of John Rawls to address the concerns of women and cognitively disabled people.

==== Later developments in liberalism ====
Amartya Sen critiques and attempts to revitalize A Theory of Justice in The Idea of Justice (2009). He praises Rawls for revitalizing interest in the topic of justice and defends his focus on fairness, but also argues that a focus on abstract, ideal scenarios detracts from finding practical solutions to injustice, as well as arguing for alternatives to Rawls's thought experiments and focus on institutions. In his book Free and Equal (2023), the economist and philosopher Daniel Chandler argued that Rawls had been "overlooked within mainstream political debate" despite his profound influence in academia, which he attributed to Rawls's reclusive personality, the abstract nature of his work and the rise of neoliberalism in the 1980s. Chandler argued that Rawls's foremost achievement was creating a theory that could support both freedom and equality, respectively the core tenets of classical liberalism and socialism, and that his ideas remain relevant today.

== Personal life ==
=== Marriage and family ===
Rawls married Margaret Warfield "Mard" Fox in 1949, and had four children. She was a major collaborator who proofread, edited, and helped index his massive manuscripts.

=== Religious views ===
Raised a devout Episcopalian, at Princeton University while working toward an undergraduate he even considered attending a seminary to study for the Episcopal priesthood, but decided to enlist into the army during World War II. His military service would eventually motivate him to abandon his faith. In his personal 1997 essay, On My Religion, he explained that after the Holocaust and his experiences in World War II, he found it impossible to believe in a traditional, personal God who actively directs human history or answers prayers.

== Awards and honors ==
- Bronze Star for radio work behind enemy lines in World War II
- Elected to the American Academy of Arts and Sciences (1966)
- Ralph Waldo Emerson Award (1972)
- Elected to the American Philosophical Society (1974)
- Member of the Norwegian Academy of Science and Letters (1992)
- Schock Prize for Logic and Philosophy (1999)
- National Humanities Medal (1999)
- Asteroid 16561 Rawls is named in his honor.

== In popular culture ==
John Rawls is featured as the protagonist of A Theory of Justice: The Musical, a musical comedy that premiered at Oxford in 2013 and was revived for the Edinburgh Fringe Festival.

== Publications ==
=== Bibliography ===
- A Study in the Grounds of Ethical Knowledge: Considered with Reference to Judgments on the Moral Worth of Character. Ph.D. dissertation, Princeton University, 1950.
- A Theory of Justice. Cambridge, MA: The Belknap Press of Harvard University Press, 1971. The revised edition of 1999 incorporates changes that Rawls made for translated editions of A Theory of Justice.
- Political Liberalism. The John Dewey Essays in Philosophy, 4. New York: Columbia University Press, 1993. The hardback edition published in 1993 is not identical. The paperback adds a new introduction and an essay titled "Reply to Habermas".
- The Law of Peoples: with "The Idea of Public Reason Revisited". Cambridge, MA: Harvard University Press, 1999. This slim book includes two works; a further development of his essay titled "The Law of Peoples", and another titled "Public Reason Revisited", both published earlier in his career.
- Collected Papers. Cambridge, MA: Harvard University Press, 1999. This collection of shorter papers was edited by Samuel Freeman.
- Lectures on the History of Moral Philosophy. Cambridge, MA: Harvard University Press, 2000. This collection of lectures was edited by Barbara Herman. It has an introduction on modern moral philosophy from 1600 to 1800 and then lectures on Hume, Leibniz, Kant and Hegel.
- Justice as Fairness: A Restatement. Cambridge, MA: Belknap Press, 2001. This shorter summary of the main arguments of Rawls's political philosophy was edited by Erin Kelly. Many versions of this were circulated in typescript and much of the material was delivered by Rawls in lectures when he taught courses covering his own work at Harvard University.
- Lectures on the History of Political Philosophy. Cambridge, MA: Harvard University Press, 2007. Collection of lectures on Thomas Hobbes, John Locke, Joseph Butler, Jean-Jacques Rousseau, David Hume, John Stuart Mill and Karl Marx, edited by Samuel Freeman.
- A Brief Inquiry into the Meaning of Sin and Faith. Cambridge, MA: Harvard University Press, 2010. With introduction and commentary by Thomas Nagel, Joshua Cohen and Robert Merrihew Adams. Senior thesis, Princeton, 1942. This volume includes a brief late essay by Rawls titled "On My Religion".

=== Articles ===
- "Outline of a Decision Procedure for Ethics". Philosophical Review (April 1951), 60 (2): 177–197.
- "Two Concepts of Rules". Philosophical Review (January 1955), 64 (1):3–32.
- "Justice as Fairness". Journal of Philosophy (October 24, 1957), 54 (22): 353–362.
- "Justice as Fairness". Philosophical Review (April 1958), 67 (2): 164–194.
- "The Sense of Justice". Philosophical Review (July 1963), 72 (3): 281–305.
- "Constitutional Liberty and the Concept of Justice". Nomos VI (1963)
- "Distributive Justice: Some Addenda". Natural Law Forum (1968), 13: 51–71.
- "Reply to Lyons and Teitelman". Journal of Philosophy (October 5, 1972), 69 (18): 556–557.
- "Reply to Alexander and Musgrave". Quarterly Journal of Economics (November 1974), 88 (4): 633–655.
- "Some Reasons for the Maximin Criterion". American Economic Review (May 1974), 64 (2): 141–146.
- "Fairness to Goodness". Philosophical Review (October 1975), 84 (4): 536–554.
- "The Independence of Moral Theory". Proceedings and Addresses of the American Philosophical Association (November 1975), 48: 5–22.
- "A Kantian Conception of Equality". Cambridge Review (February 1975), 96 (2225): 94–99.
- "The Basic Structure as Subject". American Philosophical Quarterly (April 1977), 14 (2): 159–165.
- "Kantian Constructivism in Moral Theory". Journal of Philosophy (September 1980), 77 (9): 515–572.
- "Justice as Fairness: Political not Metaphysical". Philosophy & Public Affairs (Summer 1985), 14 (3): 223–251.
- "The Idea of an Overlapping Consensus". Oxford Journal for Legal Studies (Spring 1987), 7 (1): 1–25.
- "The Priority of Right and Ideas of the Good". Philosophy & Public Affairs (Fall 1988), 17 (4): 251–276.
- "The Domain of the Political and Overlapping Consensus". New York University Law Review (May 1989), 64 (2): 233–255.
- "Roderick Firth: His Life and Work". Philosophy and Phenomenological Research (March 1991), 51 (1): 109–118.
- "The Law of Peoples". Critical Inquiry (Fall 1993), 20 (1): 36–68.
- "Political Liberalism: Reply to Habermas". Journal of Philosophy (March 1995), 92 (3):132–180.
- "The Idea of Public Reason Revisited". Chicago Law Review (1997), 64 (3): 765–807. [PRR]

=== Book chapters ===
- "Constitutional Liberty and the Concept of Justice". In Carl J. Friedrich and John W. Chapman, eds., Nomos, VI: Justice, pp. 98–125. Yearbook of the American Society for Political and Legal Philosophy. New York: Atherton Press, 1963.
- "Legal Obligation and the Duty of Fair Play". In Sidney Hook, ed., Law and Philosophy: A Symposium, pp. 3–18. New York: New York University Press, 1964. Proceedings of the 6th Annual New York University Institute of Philosophy.
- "Distributive Justice". In Peter Laslett and W. G. Runciman, eds., Philosophy, Politics, and Society. Third Series, pp. 58–82. London: Blackwell; New York: Barnes & Noble, 1967.
- "The Justification of Civil Disobedience". In Hugo Adam Bedau, ed., Civil Disobedience: Theory and Practice, pp. 240–255. New York: Pegasus Books, 1969.
- "Justice as Reciprocity". In Samuel Gorovitz, ed., Utilitarianism: John Stuart Mill: With Critical Essays, pp. 242–268. New York: Bobbs-Merrill, 1971.
- "Author's Note". In Thomas Schwartz, ed., Freedom and Authority: An Introduction to Social and Political Philosophy, p. 260. Encino & Belmont, California: Dickenson, 1973.
- "Distributive Justice". In Edmund S. Phelps, ed., Economic Justice: Selected Readings, pp. 319–362. Penguin Modern Economics Readings. Harmondsworth & Baltimore: Penguin Books, 1973.
- "Personal Communication, January 31, 1976". In Thomas Nagel's "The Justification of Equality". Critica (April 1978), 10 (28): 9n4.
- "The Basic Liberties and Their Priority". In Sterling M. McMurrin, ed., The Tanner Lectures on Human Values, III (1982), pp. 1–87. Salt Lake City: University of Utah Press; Cambridge: Cambridge University Press, 1982.
- "Social unity and primary goods" in Sen, Amartya; Williams, Bernard, eds. (1982). Utilitarianism and beyond. Cambridge / Paris: Cambridge University Press / Editions de la Maison des Sciences de l'Homme. pp. 159–185. ISBN 978-0511611964.
- "Themes in Kant's Moral Philosophy". In Eckhart Forster, ed., Kant's Transcendental Deductions: The Three Critiques and the Opus postumum, pp. 81–113, 253–256. Stanford Series in Philosophy. Studies in Kant and German Idealism. Stanford, California: Stanford University Press, 1989.

=== Reviews ===
- Review of Axel Hägerström's Inquiries into the Nature of Law and Morals (C.D. Broad, tr.). Mind (July 1955), 64 (255):421–422.
- Review of Stephen Toulmin's An Examination of the Place of Reason in Ethics (1950). Philosophical Review (October 1951), 60 (4): 572–580.
- Review of A. Vilhelm Lundstedt's Legal Thinking Revised. Cornell Law Quarterly (1959), 44: 169.
- Review of Raymond Klibansky, ed., Philosophy in Mid-Century: A Survey. Philosophical Review (January 1961), 70 (1): 131–132.
- Review of Richard B. Brandt, ed., Social Justice (1962). Philosophical Review (July 1965), 74(3): 406–409.

== See also ==
- Society for Ethical and Legal Philosophy
- List of American philosophers
- List of liberal theorists
- Philosophy and economics
