= Public reason =

Public reason requires that the moral or political rules that regulate the common life of a community be, in some sense, justifiable or acceptable to all those persons over whom the rules purport to have authority. It is an idea with roots in the work of Thomas Hobbes, Immanuel Kant, and Jean-Jacques Rousseau, and has become increasingly influential in contemporary moral and political philosophy as a result of its development in the work of John Rawls, Jürgen Habermas, and Gerald Gaus, among others.

== Kant and Rawls ==
The phrase "public use of one's reason" (Vernunft in allen Stükken öffentlichen Gebrauch) was used by Immanuel Kant in his 1784 editorial piece responding to the question "What Is Enlightenment?", where he distinguished it from private usage of reason, by which he meant reasoning offered from a specific civic office or post. This Kantian conception was further developed by American philosopher John Rawls to refer to the common reason of all citizens in a pluralist society and identified it as a component of political liberalism. Although Rawls cited the Kantian origin of his concept, his understanding is distinguished by the way he explained how public reason embodies the shared fund of beliefs and reason of those who constitute a democratic polity—those who are concerned with the good of the public and matters of basic justice.

Public reason giving, in the Rawlsian sense, involves justifying a particular position by way of reasons that people of different moral or political backgrounds could accept. Although in his later writings he added what is known as the proviso, meaning that non-public reasons could be given assuming that public reasons would be provided in due course. In order to accomplish this, however, one must overcome what he refers to as the burdens of judgment, which can produce disagreement among reasonable citizens. These burdens include conflicting evidence, giving differing weights to considerations, conceptual indeterminacy, differing experiences and value conflicts. Private reason, by contrast, is the exercise of an individual's reason to the constrained norms and interests of some sub-set of the public as a whole (such as a business, a political party, the military or the family).

Rawls also divided the concept into public reason for "liberal peoples" and public reason for the "society of peoples". The former involves public reason of free and equal liberal peoples who debate their mutual relations, while the latter involves equal citizens of domestic society debating political issues and justice concerning their government.

== See also ==
- A Theory of Justice
- Evidence-based policy
- Justice as fairness
- Public choice theory
- Rationalism
- Overlapping consensus
