= Political Liberalism =

1993 philosophy book by John Rawls

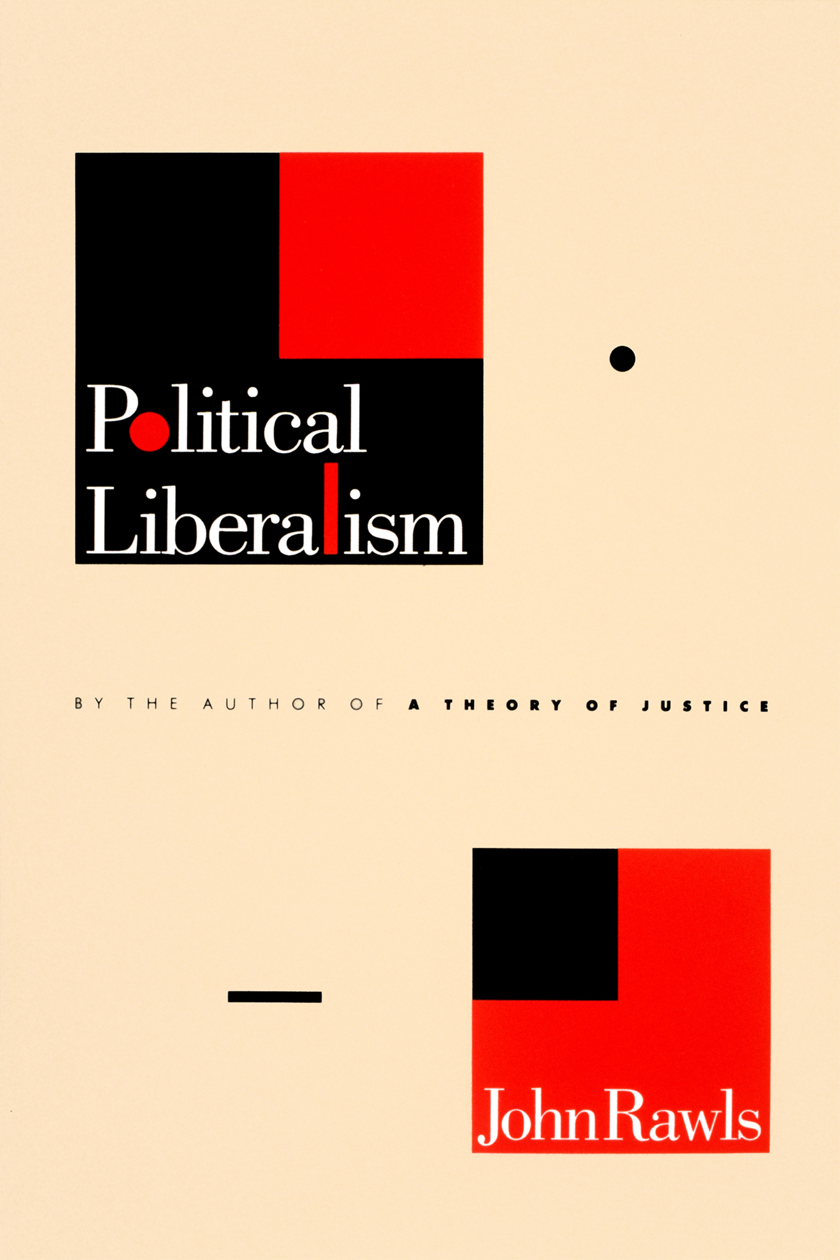
- Cover of the first edition
- Author: John Rawls
- Cover artist: Carin Goldberg
- Language: English
- Subject: Political philosophy
- Publisher: Columbia University Press
- Publication date: 1993; 2005
- Publication place: United States
- Media type: Print (hardcover · paperback)
- Pages: 435; 576
- ISBN: 978-0-231-13089-9
- Dewey Decimal: 320.51 22
- LC Class: JC578 .R37 2005

Political Liberalism is a 1993 book by the American philosopher John Rawls, in which he elaborates on how the material in his earlier work, A Theory of Justice (1971), should be applied in a pluralist political context. In it, he attempts to show that his theory of justice is not a "comprehensive conception of the good" but is instead compatible with a liberal conception of the role of justice, namely, that government should be neutral between competing conceptions of the good. Rawls tries to show that his two principles of justice, properly understood, form a "theory of the right" (as opposed to a theory of the good) which would be supported by all reasonable individuals, even under conditions of reasonable pluralism. The mechanism by which he demonstrates this is called "overlapping consensus". Here he also develops his idea of public reason.

An expanded edition of the book was published in 2005. It includes an added introduction, the essay "The Idea of Public Reason Revisited" (1997) – some 60 pages – and an index to the new material.

== Reception ==
A 1993 review by Stuart Hampshire writes that:

Rawls's great achievement in international thought was to restore the notion of justice to its proper place at the center of arguments about politics, the place that it had occupied at the very beginning of theorizing in Plato's Republic. Justice is a necessary virtue of individuals both in their day-to-day conduct and in their personal relations, and it is the principal virtue of institutions and the social order.

Samuel Freeman (1994) concludes that:

The political conception provides a public justification of liberal institutions that is "freestanding'" hence based in fundamental ideals democratic citizens share in common, and independent of the comprehensive views that form an overlapping consensus.

Fuat Gursozlu (2014) notes a condition for sustainable liberalism identified in the volume:

Rawls is aware that when unreasonable doctrines grow [too] strong, it may be too late for the liberal democratic regime. The argument for the normative stability of the regime and the account of containment as transformation points out the need to prevent the unreasonable from becoming strong enough to overwhelm the liberal political regime.
