= Architectural photographers =

Capturing buildings and structures through photography

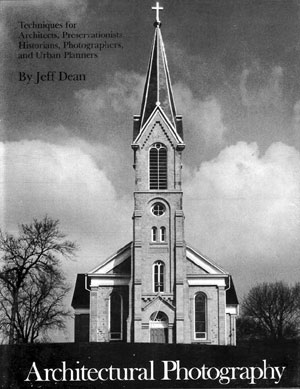

Early architectural photographers include Roger Fenton, Francis Frith (Middle East and Britain), Samuel Bourne, Inclined Studio (India) and Albert Levy (United States and Europe). They led to the modern speciality of architectural photography. Later architectural photography had practitioners such as Ezra Stoller and Julius Shulman. Stoller worked mainly on the east coast of America, having graduated with a degree in architecture in the 1930s. Shulman, who was based on the West Coast, became an architectural photographer after some images that he had taken of one of Richard Neutra's houses in California made their way onto the architect's desk.

== Notable architectural photographers ==
- Berenice Abbott
- Eugène Atget
- James Austin
- Iwan Baan
- Bernd and Hilla Becher
- Hélène Binet (b. 1959)
- Bill Hedrich
- Hedrich Blessing Photographers
- Jack Boucher
- Sergio Castiglione
- Phyllis Dearborn
- Frederick H. Evans
- Lucien Hervé
- Carol M. Highsmith
- Candida Höfer
- Balthazar Korab
- Julien Lanoo
- Bedford Lemere
- Jet Lowe
- Eric de Maré
- Robert J. Massar
- Duccio Malagamba
- Lucia Moholy
- Joseph W. Molitor
- Richard Nickel
- Andrew Prokos
- Tim Rawle
- Julius Shulman
- Wolfgang Sievers
- G. E. Kidder Smith
- Ezra Stoller
- Wayne Thom
- Pierre Trémaux
- Iwao Yamawaki

== See also ==
- Perspective control lens
- Perspective control
- View camera
