= Myth of meritocracy =

Sociological concept

Myth of meritocracy is a phrase arguing that meritocracy, or achieving upward social mobility through one's own merits regardless of one's social position, is not widely attainable in capitalist societies because of inherent contradictions. Meritocracy is argued to be a myth because, despite being promoted as an open and accessible method of achieving upward class mobility under neoliberal or free market capitalism, wealth disparity and limited class mobility remain widespread, regardless of individual work ethic. Some scholars argue that the wealth disparity has even increased because the "myth" of meritocracy has been so effectively promoted and defended by the political and private elite through the media, education, corporate culture, and elsewhere.

== History ==
Issues with meritocracy are not new. The word was coined and popularized as a pejorative but its usage has meliorated. The first known use of the term was by sociologist Alan Fox in the journal Socialist Commentary in 1956. It was then popularized by sociologist Michael Dunlop Young, who used the term in his dystopian political and satirical book The Rise of the Meritocracy in 1958. The word was adopted into the English language without the negative connotations that Young intended it to have and was embraced by supporters of the philosophy. Young expressed his disappointment in the embrace of this word and philosophy by the Labour Party under Tony Blair in The Guardian in an article in 2001:

It is good sense to appoint individual people to jobs on their merit. It is the opposite when those who are judged to have merit of a particular kind harden into a new social class without room in it for others.

== Inevitability ==
In 1990, Michael Kinsley stated, "Inequalities of income, wealth, status are inevitable, and in a capitalist system even necessary." Rising wealth disparity increasingly undermines faith in the existence of meritocracy, as beliefs in equal opportunity and social equality lose credibility among lower classes who recognize the preexisting reality of limited class mobility as a feature of the neoliberal version of capitalism. At the same time, the elite use their comparatively greater wealth, power, and influence to unequally benefit themselves and ensure their continued upper class status at the expense of lower classes, which further undermines beliefs in the existence of meritocracy.

Cornell University economist Robert H. Frank rejects meritocracy in his book Success and Luck: Good Fortune and the Myth of Meritocracy. He describes how chance plays a significant role in deciding who gets what that is not objectively based on merit. He does not discount the importance of talent and hard work, but, using psychological studies, mathematical formulae, and examples, demonstrates that among groups of people performing at a high level, chance (luck) plays an enormous role in an individual's success.

== Function ==
The myth of meritocracy has been identified by scholars as a tool of the elite of a society to uphold and justify the reproduction of existing economic, social, and political hierarchies.

=== Class mobility ===
The myth of meritocracy is used to maintain the belief that class mobility is widely attainable. As Daniel Markovits describes, "meritocracy excludes people outside of the elite, excludes middle class people and working class people from schooling, from good jobs, and from status and income, and then insults them by saying that the reason they're excluded is that they don't measure up, rather than that there's a structural block to their inclusion." Furthermore, Markovits explicitly denounces the myth of the purported "American meritocracy", which for him "has become precisely what it was invented to combat: a mechanism for the dynastic transmission of wealth and privilege across generations." Phrases such as "pull yourself up by your bootstraps" have been identified as concealing the myth of meritocracy by placing the onus of upward class mobility solely on the individual while intentionally ignoring structural conditions. The minority of individuals who manage to overcome structural conditions and achieve upward class mobility are used as examples to support the idea that meritocracy exists.

In the United States, people of lower classes are conditioned to believe in meritocracy, despite class mobility in the country being among the lowest in industrialized economies. In the U.S., 50% of a father's income position is inherited by his son. In contrast, the amount in Norway and Canada is less than 20%. Moreover, in the U.S. 8% of children raised in the bottom 20% of the income distribution are able to climb to the top 20% as adults, while the figure in Denmark is nearly double at 15%. According to an academic study on why Americans overestimate class mobility, "research indicates that errors in social perception are driven by both informational factors—such as the lack of awareness of statistical information relevant to actual mobility trends—and motivational factors—the desire to believe that society is meritocratic." Americans are more inclined to believe in meritocracy out of the prospect that they will one day join the elite or upper class. Scholars have paralleled this belief to John Steinbeck's notable quote that "the poor see themselves not as an exploited proletariat but as temporarily embarrassed millionaires." As academic Tad Delay states, "the fantasy of class mobility, of becoming bourgeois, is enough to defend the aristocracy."

Robert Reich argues that many Americans still believe in meritocracy despite "the nation drifting ever-farther away from it."

In India, the myth of meritocracy has been identified as a mechanism for the elite to justify the structure of the caste system.

=== Racism ===
The myth of meritocracy has been identified by scholars as promoting the color blind philosophy that anyone, regardless of their race or ethnicity, can succeed if they work hard enough. "This belief suggests that if a person of color is not succeeding at work (e.g. not getting promoted), it must be due to laziness or a lack of effort on that person's part," rather than a structural barrier, as described by Kevin Nadal, Katie Griffen, and Yinglee Wong. The myth of meritocracy has been identified as a tool to both dismiss institutional racism and justify racist attitudes, while also serving as an argument against affirmative action policies. The belief that the United States is a meritocracy is most accepted as an accurate reflection of reality among young, upper class whites and least accepted as an accurate reflection of reality among older, working class, people of color.

=== Tyranny of merit ===
In his 2020 book The Tyranny of Merit, Harvard University philosopher Michael Sandel makes a case against meritocracy, calling it a "tyranny". He argues that ongoing stalled social mobility and increasing inequality are laying bare the crass delusion of the American Dream, and the promise "you can make it if you want and try". The latter, according to Sandel, is the main culprit of the anger and frustration which brought some Western countries towards populism.

== See also ==
- Just-world fallacy
- Karma

== Sources ==
- Littler, Jo (2017). Against Meritocracy. doi:10.4324/9781315712802. ISBN 978-1-315-71280-2.
