= G. E. Kidder Smith =

American architectural writer (1913–1997)

- Born: October 1, 1913; Birmingham, Alabama
- Died: October 8, 1997 (aged 84); Manhattan, New York
- Education: B. F. A., M. F. A. Princeton University (1935, 1938)
- Occupations: Architect, author, photographer
- Spouse: Dorothea Fales Wilder (m. 1942)
- Children: 2
- Relatives: Francis Hopkinson Smith (great-uncle)
- Awards: AIA medal 1959

George Everard Kidder Smith (1 October 1913 – 8 October 1997) was an American architect, author, educator, photographer, "builder" of books and curator of exhibitions.

He collaborated with some of the leading publishers and graphic designers, ranging from Elaine Lustig Cohen and Leo Lionni to Paul Rand, to produce books that were both informative and visually engaging. Some publishers include The Museum of Modern Art, Harry N. Abrams, Inc., Edizioni di Comunità and Penguin Books.

Kidder Smith was an astute observer—in words and pictures—of modern architecture and the historic built environment of numerous cities and countries across the globe. During the 1950s and 1960s, as a supporter of preservationism, he rallied a number of high-profile individuals and eventually helped prevent the Robie House and Villa Savoye from being demolished. In his New York Times obituary, Herbert Muschamp described G. E. Kidder Smith as a "civic watchdog."

== Biography ==
George Everard Kidder Smith was born in Birmingham, Alabama, on October 1, 1913. He was the third of four sons of Francis Hopkinson Smith (1876–1948) and Annie Kidder (1880–1929), a wealthy Episcopalian couple originally from Baltimore. Furthermore, the author, artist, and engineer F. Hopkinson Smith (1838–1915) was G. E. Kidder Smith's great-uncle.

From an early age, he was inspired by fictional stories. Later, at school, he began engaging with architecture and photography.

He graduated from Princeton University, where he obtained a Bachelor of Fine Arts in 1935 and a Master of Fine Arts in 1938. In 1946 he was licensed as an architect.

In August 1942, Kidder Smith married Dorothea Fales Wilder (1916–2015).

During World War II, he served in the U.S. Navy with special photographic duties, which gave him the chance to encounter Captain Edward Steichen (1879–1973).

In his early career, Kidder Smith practiced architecture, and was visiting lecturer and visiting professor at Yale University School of Architecture and Massachusetts Institute of Technology.

Later on, Kidder Smith and his wife Dorothea – often accompanied by their two sons, Kidder Jr. and Hopkinson – travelled the world documenting architecture and the built environment. He was a book author and exhibition curator on architecture in the United States and abroad.

In 1959, Kidder Smith was awarded the AIA Medal for Architectural Photography. His photographs appear in the collection of the Museum of Modern Art.

G. E. Kidder Smith dedicated his life to the understanding and appreciation of architecture, particularly of modern architecture. While his photography received praise from peers, he has not received the historical assessment of other contemporary figures such as Julius Shulman and Ezra Stoller.

He died at the age of 83, on October 8, 1997, at his home in Manhattan, due to bronchiectasis.

== Books ==
- Philip Lippincott Goodwin, Brazil Builds: Architecture New and Old 1652–1942, The Museum of Modern Art, New York, 1943, with photographs by G. E. Kidder Smith;
- Switzerland Builds: Its Native and Modern Architecture, The Architectural Press, London. Albert Bonnier, New York & Stockholm 1950, dust jacket and cover by Paul Rand;
- Sweden Builds: Its Modern Architecture and Land Policy Background, Development and Contribution, The Architectural Press, London. Albert Bonnier, New York & Stockholm 1950, dust jacket and cover by Paul Rand;
- Italy Builds / L'Italia Costruisce: Its Modern Architecture and Native Inheritance / Sua Architettura Moderna e Sua Eredità Indigena, The Architectural Press, London; Reinhold Publishing Corporation, New York; Edizioni di Comunitá, Milan 1955, dust jacket and cover by Leo Lionni, endpapers by Gordon Cullen;
- The New Architecture of Europe / Guida dell'Architettura Contemporanea in Europa / Moderne Architektur in Europa: An Illustrated Guidebook and Appraisal with Photographs of 225 Postwar Buildings of Europe, The World Publishing Company 1961, book layout and cover by Elaine Lustig Cohen;
- The New Churches of Europe / Neuer Kirchenbau in Europa, Holt, Rinehart and Winston, New York, Chicago, San Francisco (North and South America); Architectural Press, London (UK); Verlag Gerd Hatje, Stuttgart (Germany); Edizioni di Comunità, Milano (Italy) 1964, dust jacket and cover by Elaine Lustig Cohen, layout by G. E. Kidder Smith, line drawings by Friedrich St. Florian;
- A Pictorial History of Architecture in America, Vols. 1, 2, American Heritage Publishing, New York 1976, graphic design with Murray Belsky;
- The Architecture of the United States: [Vol. 1] New England and Mid-Atlantic States (An Illustrated Guide to Notable Buildings, Open to the Public); [Vol. 2] The South and Midwest (An Illustrated Guide to Notable Buildings, Open to the Public); [Vol. 3] The Plains States and Far West (An Illustrated Guide to Notable Buildings, Open to the Public), Anchor Press/Doubleday Garden City New York in association with The Museum of Modern Art 1981, dust jacket and covers by Lewis Friedman;
- The Beacon Guide to New England Houses of Worship: An Architectural Companion, Beacon Press, Boston 1989, graphic design by Thomas Fischer, Pam Pokornay, and Richard Pace (cover), Lea Cyr (maps);
- Looking at Architecture, Harry N. Abrams, Inc., New York 1990, graphic design by Bob McKee;
- Source Book of American Architecture: 500 Notable Buildings from the 10th Century to the Present, Princeton Architectural Press, New York 1996, graphic design by Clare Jacobson; Allison Saltzman (cover).

== Relevant articles and essays ==
- "Alvar Aalto," The American Scandinavian Review, Winter 1940, 313–320;
- "The Tragedy of American Architecture," Magazine of Art, Vol. 38, November 1945, 255–260, 278–279;
- "The Navy Builds," The Architectural Forum, Vol. 84, n. 3, March 1946, 121–136;
- "Manhattan: Some Architectural Pleasures" in New York City and Nearby Attractions, Fodor's Travel Guide, New York 1983, 70–80.

== Exhibitions ==
- Stockholm Builds, MoMA, New York, August 4 – September 8, 1941;
- Brazil Builds, MoMA, New York, January 13 – February 28, 1943, for Philip Lippincott Goodwin;
- Power in the Pacific, MoMA, New York, January 23 – March 20, 1945, for Captain Edward Steichen;
- The Postwar Church in Germany, The Goethe House, New York, November 14 – December 14, 1957;
- The Work of Alvar Aalto, The Octagon House, Washington, December 11–29, 1963;
- America's Architectural Heritage, Memphis Chapter AIA, January 14 – February 5, 1978, Memphis, Tennessee;
- Reflection on Church Architecture: A Celebration, The Smithy Pioneer Gallery, New York, July 30 – August 17, 1991.

== TV-show and Documentaries ==
- An Architectural Odyssey with G. E. Kidder Smith, a documentary produced by WNET. Concept, writing, and production Milton Hoffman. Reviewed by Wolf Von Eckardt, "TV's Monumental Miss," Washington Post, August 2, 1978, D9.

== Unrealised works ==
- The Magnificence of Italy (c. 1957– 1961);
- The Architecture of India (c. 1967, c. 1990).

== Awards and recognition ==
- Citation of the United States Navy Photographic Institute – October 27, 1945;
- Medal for Architectural Photography by the American Institute of Architects – 1963;
- Preservation of Modern Architecture such as Robie House and Villa Savoye.

== Fellowships ==
In 1946, he was both a Guggenheim Fellow and an American-Scandinavian Fellow. In 1949, Smith was a President's Fellow at Brown University. He was awarded Fulbright Research Fellowships to Italy in 1950 and India in 1965, and a Samuel H. Kress Foundation grant in 1967. In 1967 and 1974, he received awards from the National Endowment for the Arts (NEA) and the Graham Foundation for Advanced Studies in the Fine Arts. Additionally, in 1970 and 1975, he received Ford Foundation grants.

== Lectures ==
He gave lectures at numerous architecture schools in the US, Eastern Europe, England, Ireland, India, Italy, Afghanistan, Argentina, and Japan for the State Department and Foreign Service. He also taught at Yale (1948–49) and was a visiting professor at MIT (1955–56).

== Photographs and archives ==
G. E. Kidder Smith's photographs and papers are housed in the following collections:

- Università Iuav di Venezia. Archivio G. E. Kidder Smith, Archivio Progetti, Venice, Italy;
- The Robert Elwall Photographs Collection at the RIBA, British Architectural Library, London, UK;
- The Rotch Library Visual Collections, MIT Libraries, Cambridge, Massachusetts: Kidder Smith Collection of American Architecture;
- Virginia Fine Art Museum, Richmond (VA);
- Getty Image.

== Further reading and exhibitions ==
- Maggi, Angelo (2022). G. E. Kidder Smith Builds: The Travel of Architectural Photography. Oro Editions. ISBN 9781954081536.
- Maggi, Angelo, "George Everard Kidder Smith e la scena urbana europea come esperienza estetica / George Everard Kidder Smith and the European urban scene as an aesthetic experience" in Urbanistica, n. 160, LXIX July – December 2017, 48–58.
- Maggi, Angelo, "Re-interpreting Italy Builds: l'Architettura Italiana secondo George Everard Kidder Smith," in Maria Antonietta Crippa e Ferdinando Zanzottera (edited by), Fotografia per l'Architettura del XX secolo in Italia. Costruzione della storia, progetto, cantiere, Silvana editoriale, Cinisello Balsamo 2017, 70–83.
- Maggi, Angelo, "Re-interpreting Kidder Smith's Italy Builds: Crossovers between Photography and Architecture," in Scopio. International Photography Magazine, vol. 2 (2/3) 2018, 62–77.
- Maggi, Angelo, "The Visual Transmission of European Architecture by George Everard Kidder Smith," in Inter-fotografia y Arquitectura / Inter-photography and Architecture, Servicio de Publicaciones Universidad de Navarra, Pamplona 2016, vol. 3: interpretaciones / interpretations, 140–151.
- Sabatino, Michelangelo, "G. E. Kidder Smith's Reputational Shadow", foreword in Angelo Maggi, G. E. Kidder Smith Builds. The Travel of Architectural Photography, Oro, Novato (CA) 2022, 8–17.
- G. E. Kidder Smith Photographer: Building Books, IIT College of Architecture, Chicago, May 20 – July 8, 2022.
- G. E. Kidder Smith Photographer: At Home in America, Barnsworth Gallery, The Edith Farnsworth House, Plano, Illinois, May 22 – July 31, 2022.
- G. E. Kidder Smith Photographer: Discovering Italy, Italian Cultural Institute in Chicago, Chicago, May 23 – July 8, 2022.
- G. E. Kidder Smith Photographer: The Venice Connection, Università Iuav di Venezia, May 26, 2022.
- Gil, Iker, Interview to Angelo Maggi, Michelangelo Sabatino et al., Chicago, 2022.
