= Gimm-Young Publishers, Inc. =

Publishing company

Gimm-Young Publishers, Inc. (Korean: 김영사) is a South Korean publishing company headquartered in Seoul. It was established in 1979. Over the years it has published a number of best-selling original works, including the manhwa series The Warrior Who Did Not Fall from His Horse.

It is also responsible for the Korean-language translations of a number of major foreign works, including Samuel P. Huntington's Clash of Civilizations, Michael J. Sandel's Justice: What's the Right Thing to Do?, and Richard Dawkins' The God Delusion. The company publishes approximately 250 books every year and has published over 3,000 books to date.

In 1994, Gimm-Young started its hit 'edutainment' (entertainment-education) publications which have provided children, young adults, and adults with educational resources of a new concept. The Ah! Series is an example of one of its more popular 'edutainment' titles.

In 2007, it faced controversy after the Simon Wiesenthal Center made accusations that Distant Countries and Neighbouring Countries (먼나라 이웃나라), a comic book series published by the company, contained antisemitic statements. Korean American community leaders organized protests of the company, and series author Rhie Won-bok sent a letter of apology to the Korean American Coalition in Los Angeles. CEO Park Eun-Ju apologized on behalf of the company and offered to withdraw anti-semitic images and accusations from future printings of this publication.

"We deeply regret and apologize to all those who were hurt by these images and we commit to working with the Simon Wiesenthal Center to educate the Korean people about the threat of antisemitism and the history and true values of the Jewish people."

Park has received numerous awards over the years including an award from the South Korean Ministry of Culture, Sports and Tourism in 1993, the Korea Publishers Society's Publisher of the Year Award in 2004, and a Korean Publishing Science Society award in 2013. As of 2013, she holds the position of President of the Korea Publishers Society.

== See also ==
- Korean studies
