= Wolfgang Sievers =

Australian photographer (1913–2007)

AO Wolfgang Georg Sievert
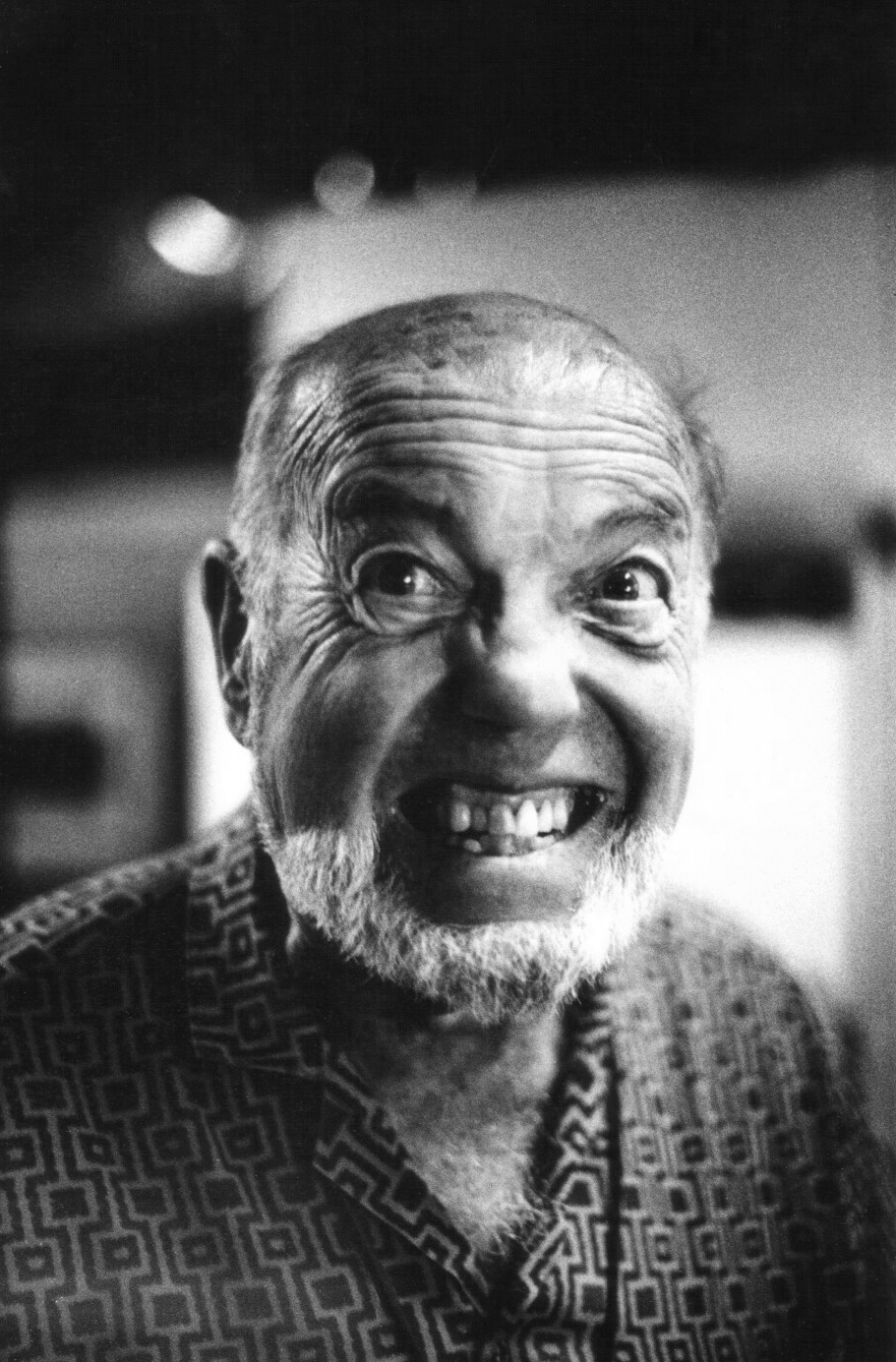
- Wolgang Sievers in 1996
- Born: 18 September 1913; Berlin, Germany
- Died: 7 August 2007 (aged 93)
- Citizenship: German; Australian
- Education: Contempora Lehrateliers für neue Werkkunst
- Occupations: Architectural photographer; industrial photographer
- Style: Bauhaus; New Objectivity
- Parents: Johannes Sievers; Herma Schiffer
- Honours: Order of Australia

Wolfgang Georg Sievers, AO (18 September 1913 – 7 August 2007) was an Australian photographer who specialised in architectural and industrial photography.

== Early life and career ==
Sievers was born on 18 September 1913, in Berlin, Germany. His father was Professor Johannes Sievers, an art and architectural historian with the German Foreign Office until his dismissal by the government in 1933, and author of the first 4 volumes of a monograph on the neo-classical architect Karl Schinkel. His mother was Herma Schiffer, a writer and educator of Jewish background who was Director of the Institute for Educational Films.

From 1936 to 1938, he studied at the Contempora Lehrateliers für neue Werkkunst in Berlin, a progressive private art school created by architect Fritz August Breuhaus de Groot, which, like the famous Bauhaus, strongly emphasised the unity of all applied arts. Sievers took architectural photographs for his father's books on Berlin's historical buildings, particularly the work of Karl Schinkel. He also spent a year working in Portugal, from 1935 to 1936. In 1938, he was retained as a teacher at the Contempora, but decided to emigrate to Australia following rumours of the school's imminent closure by the authorities. He had arranged for his photographic equipment to be transported, but was briefly questioned by the Gestapo, then conscripted as an aerial photographer for the Luftwaffe. He fled the country immediately, going first to England in June 1938:

In the evening I took the train to Holland. The next day I was in Holland, the day after that I was in England, in Kent, where my brother lived already, and he took me to the pub and I got drunk on cloudy Kentish cider for the first time in my life. It was wonderful!

In Australia, Sievers opened a studio in South Yarra, Melbourne. After war was declared, he volunteered for the Australian Army and served from 1942 to 1946. Following demobilisation, he established a studio at Grosvenor Chambers in fashionable Collins Street, initially drawing many of his commissions from fellow European immigrants including the architect Frederick Romberg, and Ernst Fuchs, who had arrived from Vienna. During his early years in Melbourne, Sievers became a lifelong friend of fellow émigré photographer Helmut Newton and his Australian actress wife, June Browne, who later made photographs herself under the pseudonym "Alice Springs".

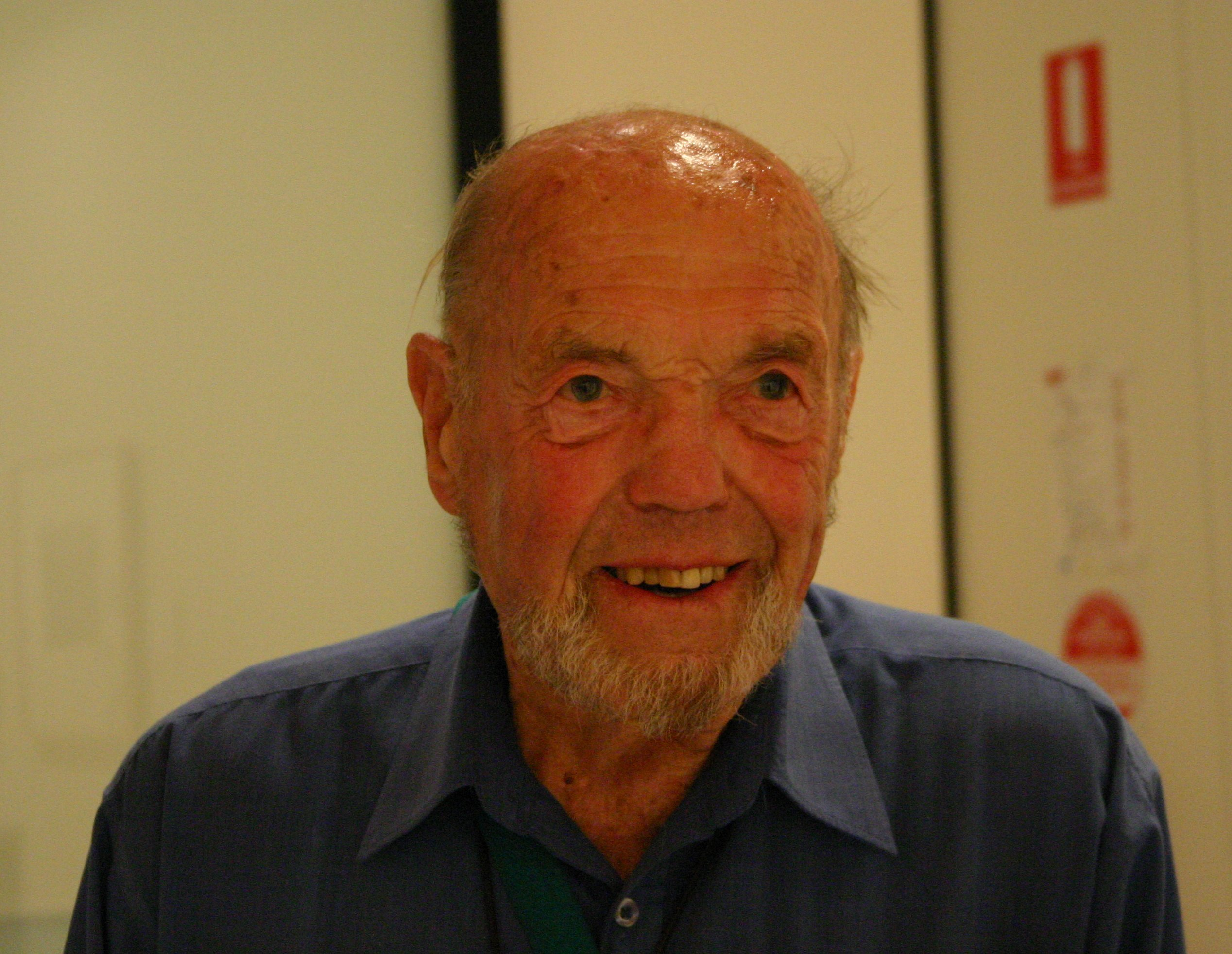
Wolfgang Sievers at the Counihan Gallery in Brunswick, Victoria in 2005

== Work ==
Significant corporate clients included Alcoa, Australian Paper Manufacturers, Comalco, Hamersley Iron, John Holland Group, John Lysaght, Shell and Vickers Ruwolt. He also received commissions from architectural firms including Bates, Smart and McCutcheon, Hassall & McConnell, Leith & Bartlett, Winston Hall and Yuncken Freeman. In the 1950s, Sievers was engaged by the then Department of Overseas Trade with a brief to change Australia's image from a land of sheep and wool to an image of a sophisticated industrial and manufacturing nation. Many of these images were published in the magazine Walkabout.

Sievers' work after the war was imbued with the Bauhaus ethos and philosophy of the New Objectivity he had learned in Berlin, combined with a socialist belief in the inherent dignity of labour. His photographs were often overtly theatrical, as he commonly photographed industrial machinery at night, isolating details with artificial light and posing workers for heightened effect. This can be seen in the 1967 Gears for Mining Industry, perhaps his best-known image, depicting a worker assembling a giant gear. Despite the contrived nature of many of these images, this approach was influential in Australian post-war commercial photography. Ennis considers that:

His photography championed the spirit of the modern age and some of its fundamental principles, especially functionalism, purity of design and objectivity. In keeping with his direct experience of European modernism, Sievers saw his role as a photographer in radical terms, aiming to unite art and industry. He approached professional photography as a creative endeavour and developed a distinctive style, characterised by bold compositions, dramatic tonal contrasts and an often extraordinary depth of field. Sievers' work also displays a penchant for grand scale and theatrical effects.

In 1989, the Australian National Gallery staged a retrospective of his work, an exhibition which travelled around the country, often accompanied by Sievers' lectures. In 2000, he was the subject of a major retrospective exhibition held in Lisbon, Portugal at the Arquivo Fotografico Municipal de Lisboa. He was appointed an Officer of the Order of Australia (AO) in 2002 "[f]or service to the arts as a photographer, and to recording Australian cultural life and heritage through the visual documentation of Australian industry and architecture of the 20th Century."

The National Library of Australia has an archive of more than 50,000 of Sievers' negatives and transparencies.

Sievers was active in Australia, Germany and Austria, with research into the emigration of war criminals to Australia from 1990 to 1998. In 2007, he donated several hundred photographs from his archive, worth up to A$1,000,000, to raise money "for justice and civil liberties" causes.

Wolfgang Sievers died on 7 August 2007, a month short of his 94th birthday.
