= Wayne Thom =

Chinese-American architectural photographer

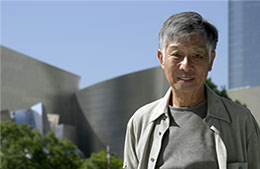
- Born: December 13, 1933 (age 92); Shanghai, China
- Education: Brooks Institute of Photography
- Occupation: Architectural photographer
- Awards: Fellow, American Society of Photographers

Wayne Thom (born December 13, 1933) is an international architectural photographer.

== Early life ==
Thom was born in Shanghai and grew up in Hong Kong before moving to Vancouver. He studied photography, first at Art Center College of Design, in Pasadena, California, and then at Brooks Institute in Santa Barbara, where he graduated in 1968.

== Career ==
Thom's career spans five decades documenting upward of 2,800 projects. He has worked with clients in North America and Asia, but based mainly in the Greater Los Angeles Area. His clients include architects and developers such as I. M. Pei, A. Quincy Jones, Arthur Erickson, Bennie Gonzales, William Pereira, Bing Thom, John Portman, Gio Ponti, Kajima USA, NBBJ and SOM.

== Achievements ==
- Modern Masters Awards, Los Angeles Conservancy 2015
- Fellow, American Society Of Photographers since 1980
- Member, Board of Director USC Architectural Guild 1982–1986
- Recipient of Steuben Award by Kodak 1982
- Speaker, 88th International Exposition of Professional Photography 1979
- Speaker, 85th International Exposition of Professional Photography 1977
- Speaker, 82nd International Exposition of Professional Photography 1973
- Recipient of First Award, PPG Architectural Photographer Invitational, 1973
- Member, Advisory Board LA Tech. 1972
- Member, Board of Trustees Brooks Institute of Photography 1971–1975
- Recipient of the Professional Photographer West Aurora Award in 1971, 72, 73
- Recipient of Ernest H. Brook Achievement Award 1968
- Life member, Professional Photographer Of America

== Exhibitions ==
- Matter, Light and Form: Architectural Photographs of Wayne Thom, 1968–2003, WUHO Gallery, Los Angeles, 2015.

== Publications ==
- Steel, James, ed. (2002). William Pereira. Photography by Julius Shulman and Wayne Thom. USC Guild Press. ISBN 1890449202.
- Buckner, Cory (2002). A Quincy Jones. Photography by Wayne Thom. Paidon. ISBN 0714848433.
- Newman, Morris (2006). Altoon + Porter Architects: Selected Current Works. Photography by Wayne Thom. Images Publishing. ISBN 1876907444.
- Bills, Emily (2020), Wayne Thom: Photographing the Late Modern, New York: The Monacelli Press

== Articles ==
- Lubell, Sam (2015-11-01). "Wayne Thom, the Master Photographer Who Teased Out Brutalism's Elegant Side". WIRED.
- "Architectural photographer Wayne Thom's beautiful images head to USC Libraries". USC News. news.usc.edu. 31 August 2015.
- "On View - Matter, Light, and Form: Architectural Photographs of Wayne Thom, 1968–2003". archpaper.com. 11 November 2015.
- "Photographer Wayne Thom captured Late Modernism like no one else, and now his archive is looking for a home". archpaper.com. 10 July 2015.
- "In Wayne Thom's revelatory show, a generation of L.A. buildings gets needed attention". touch.latimes.com.
