= Victor Enrich =

Spanish photographer

Víctor Enrich
- Born: 1976 (age 49–50)
- Known for: Architectural photography
- Notable work: City Portraits, NHDK
- Website: victorenrich.com

Victor Enrich (born 1976) is a Catalan photographer.

== City Portraits (2011) ==
City Portraits is a series of architectural photographs manipulated to create impossible structures, including a skyscraper split vertically in half, a house turned upside down and a motorway running vertically. Locations include Tel Aviv, Riga and Munich. Enrich said the photographs were not intended as commentary on architecture or urbanism but rather were "simply chosen to become a channel to express myself".

== NHDK (2013) ==
In 2013 Enrich produced NHDK, a series of 88 manipulated photographs of the Deutscher Kaiser hotel in Munich. The images, which all display the building from the same angle, imagine it variously with parts rotated, duplicated, removed and floating in the sky.

== 2016–present ==
Following the 2016 United States presidential election, Enrich's work focused on Donald Trump. As of 2026, Enrich's current projects include work responding to gentrification and the politics of Catalonia, and work in oil painting.
