= Malagamba =

Malagamba may refer to:

- Duccio Malagamba (born 1960), Italian architectural photographer.
- Miguel Lobo y Malagamba (1821–1876), Spanish admiral
