= Dignity of labour =

Philosophy that respects all forms of labor equally

The dignity of labour or the dignity of work is the philosophical holding that all types of jobs are respected equally, and no occupation is considered superior and none of the jobs should be discriminated on any basis. This view holds that all types of work (jobs) are necessary in a society and it is absolutely wrong to consider any work good or bad: the work itself is a dignity.

Scottish philosopher Thomas Carlyle has been cited as "the first to espouse the 'dignity of work'". In Past and Present (1843), he wrote:

Labour is Life: from the inmost heart of the Worker rises his god-given Force, the sacred celestial Life-essence breathed into him by Almighty God; from his inmost heart awakens him to all nobleness,—to all knowledge, 'self-knowledge' and much else, so soon as Work fitly begins.

Former U.S. President Joe Biden made restoring "the dignity of work" a central tenet of his 2020 campaign and administration.

== About ==
Social reformers such as Basava and his contemporary Sharanas, as well as Mahatma Gandhi, were prominent advocates of the dignity of labour.

The dignity of labour is one of the major themes in Christian ethics, and as such, it is upheld by the Anglican Communion, in Catholic social teaching, in Methodist principles, and in Reformed theology.

In Roman Catholicism, usually titled "The dignity of work and the rights of workers" the affirmation of the dignity of human labour is found in several papal encyclicals, most notably Pope John Paul II's Laborem Exercens, published 15 September 1981.

In his 2020 book The Tyranny of Merit, philosopher Michael Sandel says that a spiritual revolution that celebrates the dignity of labour rather than meritocracy is the way to rectify the loss of faith in institutions evidenced in populism.

== See also ==
- Critique of work
- Decent work
