= Trémaux =

Trémaux is a surname. Notable people with the surname include:

- Charles Pierre Trémaux (1859–1882), French inventor of a maze solving algorithm, named after him
- Pierre Trémaux (1818-1895), French architect, photographer, and author
