= Juergen Nogai =

German architecture, art and documentary photographer

- Born: July 2, 1953; Jessen/Elster, East Germany
- Education: University of Cologne
- Occupation: Photographer

Juergen Nogai (born 2 July 1953 in Jessen/Elster, south of Berlin) is a German architecture, art and documentary photographer.

== Biography ==
=== Early life ===
Juergen Nogai began his studies as a Fine Arts major with parallel studies in Film, Theatre and Television Science, and German Language at the University of Cologne, West Germany. He then went to the University of Osnabrueck, West Germany and earned a teaching degree in German Language and Fine Arts, which he taught concurrently with his career as a free-lance photographer. He maintained his studio in Bremen, Germany, where he worked for museums, architects, publishers, companies, design and advertising agencies.

=== Career ===
In 2000 he re-located to Los Angeles and began working on numerous book projects for Harry N. Abrams, Inc., New York and Taschen, Cologne, Germany. It was during this period that Juergen began his decade long collaboration with architectural photographer Julius Shulman. They have had numerous gallery and museum exhibitions of their work and Juergen is represented by Craig Krull Gallery, in Los Angeles.

J. Shulman, his friend and creative photography partner, died July 15, 2009, and Juergen Nogai retains the copyrights to the archive created during their decade long collaboration.

"As an architectural photographer I have to find the way to capture the feelings these (architectural) objects evoke in me. That means – not just 'shooting' the building or creating an 'interesting graphic pattern'. It is important to develop an aesthetic sensitivity to create a striking and clear presentation of the structure. This view becomes a compositional dialogue between the object and myself."

His work is part of the permanent collections of The Los Angeles County Museum of Art, Palm Springs Art Museum and DAM, The Frankfurt Design and Architecture Museum, Orange County Museum, Ca., Santa Barbara Museum of Art, George Eastman House, Rochester, NY. He lectures around the country and teaches workshops on Architectural Photography at the Palm Springs Photo Festival each spring.

== Selected bibliography ==
- "MALIBU, A Century of Living by the Sea", Harry N. Abrams, New York 2005
- "ABRAHAM ZABLUDOVSKY", a monograph book published by Arquine, Mexico City 2005
- "DREAM PALACES OF HOLLYWOOD’S GOLDEN AGE", Harry N. Abrams, New York 2005
- "CASE STUDY HOUSE #21" - Wright Auction House - Limited Edition bound Auction Catalogue-2006
- "THE RUSSIAN GARBO / STEN/ NEUTRA HOUSE" - Pentagram Publication
- "VENICE CA: Art and Architecture in a Maverick Community", Harry N. Abrams, 2007
- "FELIX CANDELA" - TASCHEN, Cologne, 2008
- "MEDITERRANEAN HOUSES", Harry N. Abrams, New York 2008
- "BERNHARD HOETGER", (complete works), H.M. Hauschild Verlag, Bremen 1998
- "MAIOLICA and GLASS / The Hockemeyer Collection", H.M. Hauschild Verlag, Bremen 2003
- "20th CENTURY ITALIAN CERAMIC ART / The Hockemeyer Collection", Hirmer Verlag, Muenchen 2009
- "SACRED SITES of SOUTHERN CALIFORNIA" University of Nebraska Press, 2010
- "JULIUS SHULMAN - THE LAST DECADE", Photographs by Julius Shulman / Jürgen Nogai, Kehrer, Heidelberg, 2010, ISBN 978-3-86828-159-0
- "JULIUS SHULMAN - HOT AND COOL", Fotografien von Julius Shulman und Jürgen Nogai, ZEPHYR Space for Photography, Mannheim, 2010, ISBN 978-3-927774-35-3
- "HOUSES OF THE SUNDOWN SEA: The Architectural Vision of Harry Gesner", Harry N. Abrams, New York 2011

His work has been included extensively in publications some of which include:

- "THE CASE STUDY HOUSES", TASCHEN, Cologne 2002
- "BAUHAUS", TASCHEN, 2006
- "WORLD ARCHITECTURE" - TASCHEN, 2007

"Richard Neutra", “John Lautner”, “Rudolf Schindler”, “Pierre Koenig” - TASCHEN Edition

- "XL WRIGHT VOL I, II, III", TASCHEN, Cologne 2009, 2010
- "LIVING WEST", Monacelli Press, 2009
- "JULIUS SHULMAN: CHICAGO MID-CENTURY MODERNISM”, for Rizzoli 2010
- "STEEL AND SHADE - Donald Wexler", L. Weiss Bricker & S. Williams:, Kehrer, Heidelberg, 2011, ISBN 978-3-86828-191-0
- "COOP HIMMELB(L)AU", M. Mönninger, P. Goessel, TASCHEN Edition, Köln, 2010, 978-3-8365-1788-1
- "HENRY T. SEGERSTROM - The courage of imagination and the development of the arts in Southern California", B. Rychlak, Assouline, New York, 2013, ISBN 978-1-61428-104-7

== Exhibitions ==
- 2005 DAM-Frankfurt Design and Architecture Museum-Exhibition with Julius Shulman, Germany
- 2006 Barnsdall Municipal Art Gallery – Frank Lloyd Wright Retrospective with J. Shulman, Los Angeles, CA.
- 2007 MODAA + SPF: a - with J. Shulman, Culver City, CA.
- 2007 CRAIG KRULL GALLERY –with J. Shulman, Santa Monica, CA.
- 2008 PALM SPRINGS ART MUSEUM -with J. Shulman, Palm Springs, CA.
- 2009 CRAIG KRULL GALLERY – with J. Shulman, Santa Monica, CA.
- 2009 ArtHAUS, Venice CA.
- 2010 October Reiss Engelhorn Museum, Manheim, Germany
- 2011 PALM SPRINGS ART MUSEUM, "Steel and Shade", D. Wexler
- 2011/12 Oktober / Januar, "Julius Shulman/Juergen Nogai: Modern Living" Fotoausstellung im ZeitHaus, Autostadt Wolfsburg
- 2013 April / Mai Kunstclub Hamburg "blanc et noir", group exhibition (The best work of 18 artists with a lot contrast and midtones)
- 2013 Mai / Juni Bornhold (Einrichter), Hamburg, "Eileen Grey & blanc et noir", group exhibition
- 2014 Februar / März Kunsthandel Wolfgang Werner, Bremen - Berlin, "J. Shulman & J. Nogai"
- 2022 April / September Guggenheim Bilbao, Spain / 'Motion - Autos Art Architecture', curated by Norman Foster
- 2022 November / Februar F15Gallery Bremen, Germany / `Not only Architecture`, J. Shulman & J. Nogai
- 2024 Dezember / Februar F15Gallery Bremen, Germany / `Rent the World for your Party`, J. Nogai
- 2025 März / April Kunsthandel Wolfgang Werner, Berlin, European Month of Photography, `L.A. Moments`, J. Nogai
