= Rhie Won-bok =

South Korean cartoonist and professor (born 1946)

- Born: 4 October 1946 (age 79); Taejon, Southern Korea (now Daejeon, South Korea)
- Education: Seoul National University
- Occupation: Cartoonist

Korean name
- Hangul: 이원복
- Hanja: 李元馥
- RR: I Wonbok
- MR: I Wŏnbok

Rhie Won-bok (born 4 October 1946) is a South Korean cartoonist and professor.

== Education ==
Rhie was born in what is now Daejeon, South Korea. He studied architecture in Seoul National University, after which he studied graphic design in Münster, Germany.

== Works ==
His comics are drawn in a simple, didactic manner, often explaining the inner workings and the psychological makeup of nations like Germany, Japan, or the United States. He does this by taking into account historical, geographic and political factors, drawing in a funny style. An English translation of "Korea Unmasked", dealing with the Korean nations, was published in 2002 by Gimm-Young International. Most of his other works are untranslated and available in Korean only.

== Other activities ==
He received the Noonsol Award in 1993 for contributions to the development of the South Korean cartoon industry.

From 1998 to 2000 he was president of the Korean Society of Cartoon and Animation Studies.

He is professor of graphic design at Duksung Women's University in Seoul, South Korea.

== Works ==
- Rhie, Won-bok: Korea Unmasked. Gimm-Young International, 2002. ISBN 978-89-349-1771-7
