= Pierre Trémaux =

French architect, photographer and scientific writer (1818–1895)

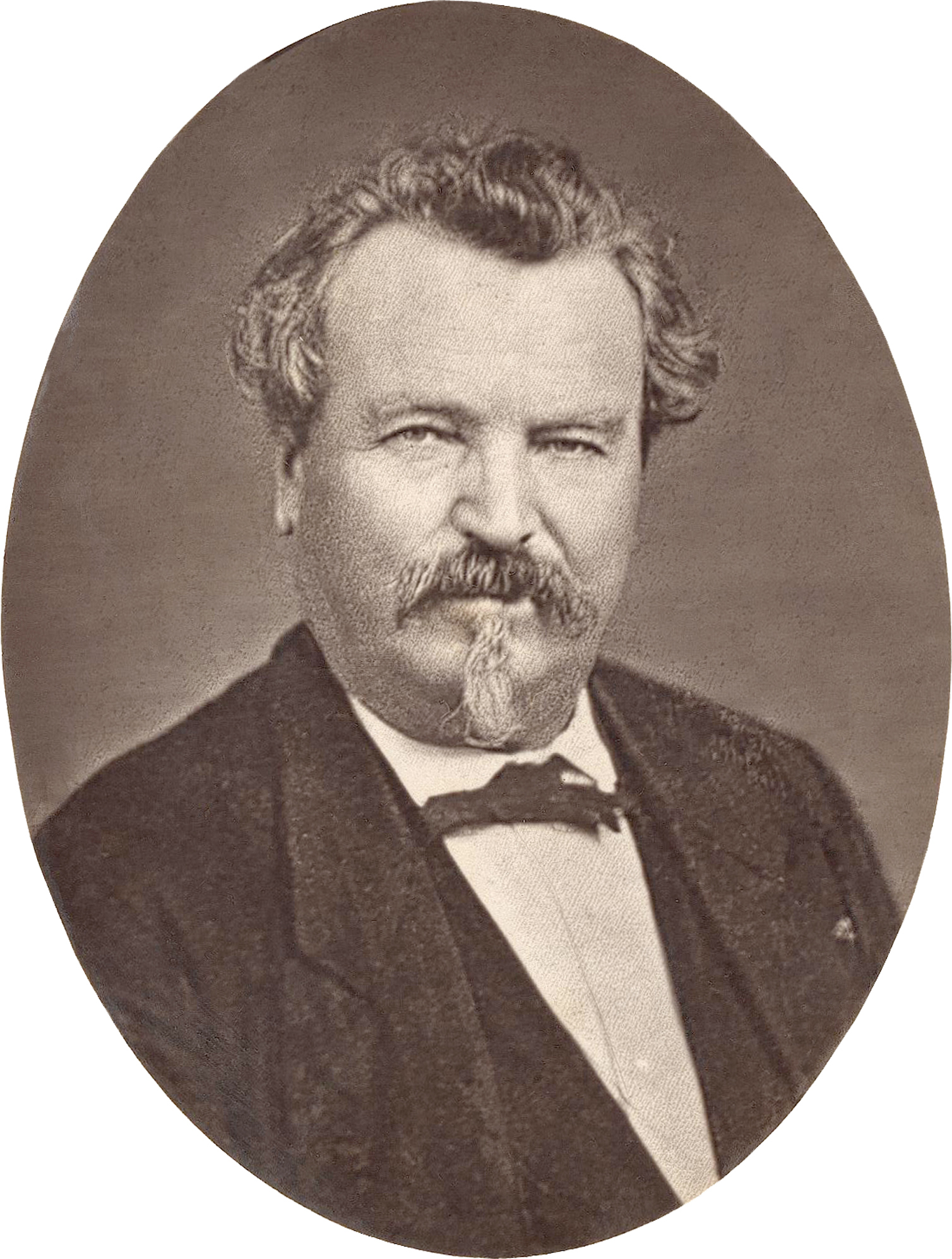
- Portrait of Pierre Trémaux, 1866
- Born: 20 July 1818; Charrecey, France
- Died: 12 March 1895 (aged 76); Tournus, France
- Education: École des Beaux-Arts
- Known for: architect, illustrator, author and photographer
- Movement: Orientalist
- Awards: Chevalier, Légion of Honour; Prix de Rome

Pierre Trémaux (20 July 1818 – 12 March 1895) was a French architect, Orientalist photographer and author of numerous scientific and ethnographic publications.

== Life and career ==
Very little is known about Pierre Trémaux's life. He was born in Charrecey, France, into a family of modest means. He was the son of Jean-Marie Trémaux, a farmer and Claudine Renaudin, and had at least two sisters. Details of his final years are very sketchy and no details of his death and final resting place are known.

Trémaux distinguished himself in many fields. He entered the École des Beaux-Arts in 1840 and received the second Prix de Rome in Architecture in 1845. As a trained architect, he worked at the Schneider establishments in Le Creusot. He was interested in urbanism and the construction of the Suez Canal in Egypt.

Interested in natural history, he traveled to Algeria, Tunisia, Upper Egypt, Sudan and Ethiopia in 1847–1848, where he made many drawings and was one of the first persons to produce photographic images of these regions. From Alexandria, he traveled up the Nile to Nubia. In 1853–1854, he undertook a second photographic trip to Libya, Egypt, Asia Minor, Tunisia, Syria and Greece. Having spent seven years in the region, he returned from these trips with many illustrations and photographic images, some of the first photographs ever made of the region and its people.

== Work ==
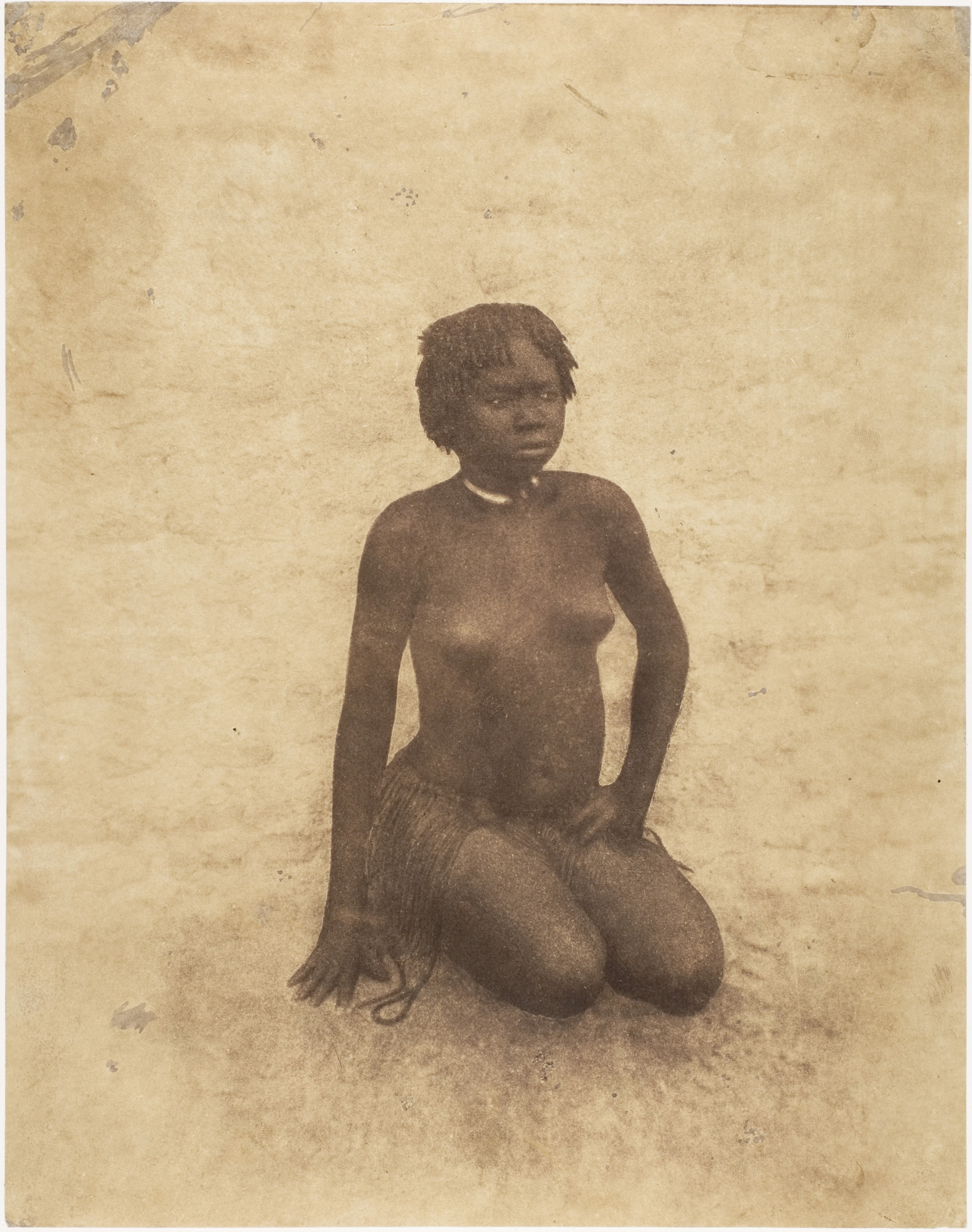
Young woman in Sudan, photograph by Trémaux, 1853–1854

=== Photography ===
With 21 photographs and 56 lithographs made after his photos, relatively few have survived, and their condition is poor. According to Chief Curator of Photography at the Israel Museum, Nissan N. Perez, his photographs "reveal that Trémaux had an interest in anthropological photography, and, had he succeeded, it might have been a most important survey of Oriental types and customs, and not, as it is today, a mere gallery of curiosities."

Nevertheless, his published works, such as the Voyages series of 1852 to 1862, were the first books on Egypt, Sudan, Palestine and other Middle Eastern regions with illustrations based on photographs by the author.

=== Theory of evolution ===
Trémaux is also the author of a work that caused a sensation at the 1867 Universal Exhibition in Paris titled, Origine et transformations de l'homme et des autres êtres (Origin and transformations of man and other beings, 1865). In this book he proposed an evolutionary theory that racial differences have "a natural basis" in biology and geology. According to Trémaux's theory, differences in human races were attributable to differences in soil content. Trémaux's theory also incorporated the idea that evolution has an innate progressive tendency, a concept known as orthogenesis.

=== Publications ===
Between 1852 and 1868, Trémaux produced a number of distinct groups of photographic plates to accompany texts on the geography, architecture, and people of regions in Africa and Asia Minor. Produced with the support of the French government, these high quality publications combined an array of graphic techniques in ways that had not previously been attempted. His surviving images are salted paper prints, engravings, tinted and colour lithographs and photolithographs.

Articles

- "Notice d’un voyage sur le cours du Nil et dans des parties inconnues du Soudan, chez les nègres Bertha, du Darfok et du Dar-Gourum," Bulletin de la Société de Géographie, 1849, sèr., 12 pp 67–72
- "Notes sur la localité ou sont situées les principales mines d’or du Soudan oriental, et observations critiques sur le récit du Colonel Kovalevski relatif à cette même contrée." Bulletin de la Société de Géographie, 1850, sér. 13 (73–78)
- "Quelques détails sur les prétendus hommes à queue," Bulletin de la Société de Géographie, 1855, 4e sér., 9 (49–54), p. 139-148
- "Épisode d’un voyage au Soudan oriental et remarques sur l’esclavage," Bulletin de la Société de Géographie, 1856, 4e sér., 11 (61–66), p. 153-164
- "Remarques sur l’Afrique centrale et orientale," Bulletin de la Société de Géographie, 1862, 5e sér., 3 (13–18), p. 69-86 et 147–165

Books

- Parallèle des édifices anciens et modernes du continent africain, illustré de 82 planches et une carte de l'Afrique Centrale, 1858
- Dessinés et relevés de 1847 à 1854 dans l'Algerie, les régences de Tunis et de Tripoli, l'Égypte, la Nubie, les déserts, l'île de Méroé, le Sennar, le Fa-Zogle, etc.
- Exploration archéologique en Asie mineure, illustré de 92 planches, 1864
- Voyage en Éthiopie, au Soudan Oriental et dans la Nigritie, atlas illustré de 61 planches, Hachette, 1852
- Voyage en Éthiopie, au Soudan Oriental et dans la Nigritie, Vol 1: Égypte et Éthiopie, textes de l'Atlas, Hachette, 1862
- Voyage en Éthiopie, au Soudan Oriental et dans la Nigritie, Vol. 2: Le Soudan, textes de l'Atlas, Hachette, 1862.
- Origine et transformations de l'homme et des autres êtres, Hachette, 1865
- Principe universel de la vie, de tout mouvement et de l'état de la matière, Chez l'auteur, 1868, 1874, 1876
- Origine des espèces et de l'homme avec les causes de fixité et de transformation et principe universel du mouvement et de la vie ou loi des transmissions de force, 1898

== See also ==
- Architectural photography
- Architectural photographers
- History of Photography
- Orientalism
- Punctuated equilibrium

== Bibliography ==
- Pierre Trémaux, in François Pouillon (ed.), Dictionnaire des orientalistes de langue française, Paris, IISMM & Karthala, 2008, pp. 940 – 941, ISBN 978-2-84586-802-1
- "Comptes-rendus de la Société de Géographie à Paris de 1850 à 1897" (online on Gallica).
- Nicolas Le Guern, "L'Égypte et ses premiers photographes : étude des différentes techniques et du matériel utilisés de 1839 à 1869", 2001
