= Liberalism and the Limits of Justice =

1982 book by Michael Sandel

- Cover of the first edition
- Author: Michael Sandel
- Language: English
- Subject: Liberalism
- Publisher: Cambridge University Press
- Publication date: 1982
- Publication place: United States
- Media type: Print (Hardcover and Paperback)
- Pages: 231
- ISBN: 978-0521567411

Liberalism and the Limits of Justice (1982; second edition 1998) is a book by the American political philosopher Michael J. Sandel. The book presents a critique of John Rawls' theory of justice as fairness, as articulated in A Theory of Justice (1971). Sandel challenges Rawls' conception of the self and argues that liberal political philosophy inadequately accounts for the embeddedness of individuals in social and historical contexts. The book is considered a significant contribution to communitarian critiques of liberalism, although Sandel does not fully embrace the communitarian label.

== Summary ==
=== The Unencumbered Self ===
A central argument of the book is that Rawls' theory relies on a conception of the self that is "unencumbered," meaning that individuals are considered as free, rational agents independent of particular social, historical, or communal ties. This notion is exemplified in Rawls' original position, a hypothetical decision-making scenario in which individuals choose principles of justice behind a "veil of ignorance," unaware of their personal characteristics, social status, or particular values.

At a basic level, Sandel's critique suggests that Rawls' model does not reflect how people actually conceive of themselves in everyday life. Sandel agrees that people do not make moral and political decisions in a vacuum but rather within the contexts of their relationships, histories, and social roles. Sandel deepens this argument by asserting that an individual’s identity is not merely influenced by external circumstances but is constitutively shaped by them. That is, who we are is inextricably tied to the particular communities, traditions, and histories that form us. To assume a person can abstract from these defining features is to misrepresent the nature of human selfhood.

=== The Problem of Moral Agency ===
Sandel further critiques Rawls by questioning whether the liberal self, as depicted in A Theory of Justice, can genuinely possess the depth required for moral agency. He argues that if individuals are truly independent of communal ties, they would lack the attachments necessary to develop a coherent moral identity. Moral commitments, in this view, are not merely chosen but are constitutive of who individuals are.

At a surface level, Sandel’s claim is that Rawlsian liberalism risks portraying moral choices as isolated, rational calculations, rather than as deeply embedded in one's existing values and traditions. At a more profound level, Sandel challenges the assumption that moral deliberation occurs within a purely procedural framework. Instead, he suggests that our moral reasoning is inherently situated – it emerges from within a web of pre-existing obligations, narratives, and self-understandings that cannot be bracketed away without distorting the reality of ethical life. By failing to account for this, Rawls' theory presents a vision of justice that is not fully responsive to the ways people actually conceive of their duties and commitments.

=== Justice and Community ===
Another key argument in the book is that Rawls' emphasis on fairness and individual rights risks neglecting the importance of communal attachments and shared values. Rawls argues that principles of justice should be chosen independently of any particular conception of the good life, ensuring neutrality among different moral and religious doctrines. However, Sandel contends that this neutrality is itself a substantive moral commitment rather than a purely procedural framework.

Initially, Sandel's critique might seem to suggest that Rawls underestimates the role of social relationships in shaping ethical life. However, his argument runs deeper: he asserts that political philosophy cannot avoid substantive moral commitments, even when it claims to be neutral. The effort to construct a just society without endorsing any particular conception of the good, Sandel argues, already assumes a particular liberal ethic—one that prioritizes individual autonomy over more embedded forms of belonging. A truly adequate account of justice must therefore recognize that principles of justice are always informed by deeper conceptions of the good life.

=== Critique of Liberal Neutrality ===
Sandel challenges the liberal claim that justice can be formulated without reference to particular conceptions of the good life. He argues that all political theories, including Rawls', inevitably make implicit assumptions about human flourishing. While Rawls aims to construct a framework that allows individuals to pursue their own conceptions of the good, Sandel maintains that such a framework cannot be truly neutral. Instead, he argues that any theory of justice must engage with substantive questions about what it means to live a good human life.

At first glance, this argument may seem like a call for greater moral engagement in political philosophy. However, Sandel's position extends further: he suggests that the very attempt to avoid substantive moral commitments leads to an internally incoherent liberalism. By refusing to take a stand on what constitutes a good life, liberalism paradoxically ends up imposing its own vision of the good – one rooted in individual autonomy and procedural fairness. Sandel thus invites a rethinking of justice that acknowledges its inherently ethical dimensions rather than treating it as a purely formal or neutral construct.

== Publication history ==
The book was first published in 1982 and a revised edition was released in 1998 by Cambridge University Press.

The second edition includes a new introduction in which Sandel responds to further developments in political philosophy, particularly the continued influence of Rawls' ideas and the rise of deliberative democracy. Sandel clarifies his critique of Rawls and engages with responses from liberal theorists who sought to defend Rawlsian justice. The revised edition also reflects on the broader implications of the communitarian critique and discusses how debates surrounding liberalism and its alternatives evolved in the years following the book’s original publication.

== Reception ==
Liberalism and the Limits of Justice received a positive review from Mark Sagoff in the Yale Law Journal. Sagoff endorsed Sandel's "criticism of contemporary utilitarian and Kantian conceptions of the good". He expressed agreement with Sandel's views of liberalism and the nature of the self. He also agreed with Sandel's criticisms of Rawls's view of the origins of the principles of justice and of "the idea of a social contract dependent on possessive individualism." He compared Sandel's views to those of the philosophers F. H. Bradley, Thomas Hill Green, and Bernard Bosanquet, but believed that his work was open to criticism in that it did not advance sufficiently beyond them and left some questions unresolved.

Norman Care of Oberlin College calls the book "well-written and interesting to read" and compliments it for its extended critique of "deep individualism". He notes that Sandel's assessment of Rawlsian theory is novel due to its focus on the idea of community.

The philosopher Sheldon Wolin called the book "the best political critique of Rawls from a communitarian and participatory perspective." The philosopher Richard Rorty described the book as "clear and forceful". He credited Sandel with providing "very elegant and cogent arguments against the attempt to use a certain conception of the self, a certain metaphysical view of what human beings are like, to legitimize liberal politics." The philosopher Jonathan Wolff wrote that Sandel provides the fullest development of the argument that Rawls bases his political philosophy on an untenable metaphysics of the self. The philosopher Will Kymlicka wrote that Liberalism and the Limits of Justice is Sandel's best-known book, and helped start the liberalism-communitarianism debate that dominated Anglo-American political philosophy in the 1980s.
