= Duccio Malagamba =

Italian architectural photographer (born 1960)

Duccio Malagamba (born 1960) is an Italian architectural photographer.

== Life and work ==
Malagamba was born in La Spezia, Italy.

In more than 25 years of professional experience he participated in several exhibitions, lectures, and juries, and four times has been awarded with “Lux” National Photography Prizes, granted by the Spanish Association of Professional Photographers. He collaborates with architects such as Alvaro Siza, Herzog & de Meuron, Rafael Moneo, EMBT, and Coop Himmelb(l)au, and his photographs are regularly featured in specialized magazines and publishing houses worldwide.

After graduating in Architecture cum laude from the Genoa University, he moved to Barcelona to begin his career as an architect. He soon joined the studio MBM (Martorell-Bohigas-Mackay) Arquitectos, where, among other responsibilities, he led the winning team for the “Un Progetto per Siena” international competition. In 1989 he won a scholarship granted by the “CNR” (Italian National Research Centre) for a research on Spanish Contemporary Architecture. Carrying out the research he took up his youthful interest in photography and his images obtained general recognition. In 1991 he decided to devote himself entirely to architectural photography.

Along with his work as a photographer, Duccio Malagamba is the author of various articles on photography and architecture. From February 1995 to February 1996 he was appointed managing editor (Director Técnico) of the Spanish architecture and design magazine ‘Diseño Interior’. After the conversion of 'Diseño Interior' into a magazine mainly focused on interior and furniture design, he continued his collaboration being the editor in charge of the architecture section 'Gran Formato' (1998-2008).

"His architectural reportages, conceived as a narrative essay rather than a set of separate images, aim to convey to the observer a complex range of emotions, experiences and reflections, providing an exhaustive and multifaceted vision of the project. However, the main purpose of his visual research is to inspire and stimulate the spectator, rather than to transmit objective information about the intervention portrayed.".

== Publications ==
- Rafael Moneo - International Portfolio 1985-2012. Photography by Duccio Magamba. Stuttgart: Edition Axel Menges. 2013. ISBN 978-3-936681-56-7.
- Álvaro Siza: Museu Serralves Porto. Museum Building Guides. Photographic Essay by Duccio Magamba. Barcelona: Ediciones Polígrafa. 2011. ISBN 978-84-343-1283-8.
- Okatsuka, Akiko (2009). "Photography / Inspiration – Readings of Architectural Inspiration Through Photographs". A+U: Architecture and Urbanism (460).
- Ludevid, Jordi (2008). "Fotografia D'Arquitectura: Duccio Malagamba". INDE Informació I Debat, Collegi d'Arquitectes de Catalunya (5/08).
- Rodger, Nelda (2007). "Give Us Your Best Shot: Ake E:son Lindman, Duccio Malagamba, Cristobal Palma, Edmund Sumner, Nic Lehoux". Azure (174).
- Arenas, Carlos (2006). "Duccio Malagamba. Arquitectura Espectáculo". Salir Salir Urban (64).
- Elwall, Robert (2004). Building with Light. The international History of Architectural Photography. London: Merrell. ISBN 978-1-85894-215-5.
- Gagliardi, Maria Letizia (2004). La Misura dello Spazio. Fotografia e Architettura: Conversazioni con i Protagonisti. Rome: Contrasto. ISBN 978-88-6965-224-0.
- Through the Lens. International Architectural Photographers. Victoria (Australia): Images Publishing. 2002. ISBN 978-1-876907-26-6.
- Alvaro Siza (Archipockets). Te Neues. 2002. ISBN 978-3-8238-5580-4.
- Pinto Guedes, Jorge (2002). "Fotografia de Arquitectura". Arte Fotográfica (24).
- Ambrós, Jordi (1999). "Fotografía de Arquitectura. Duccio Malagamba: Alguien teme al fotógrafo de arquitectura?". ON Diseño (209).
- Dechau, Wilfried (1995). Architektur Abbilden. Stuttgart: Deutsche Verlags-Anstalt. ISBN 978-3-421-03092-4.
- Dechau, Wilfried (1995). "Architekturfotografie. Duccio Malagamba". Deutsche Bauzeitung (129).
