= Julien Lanoo =

Belgian architectural photographer

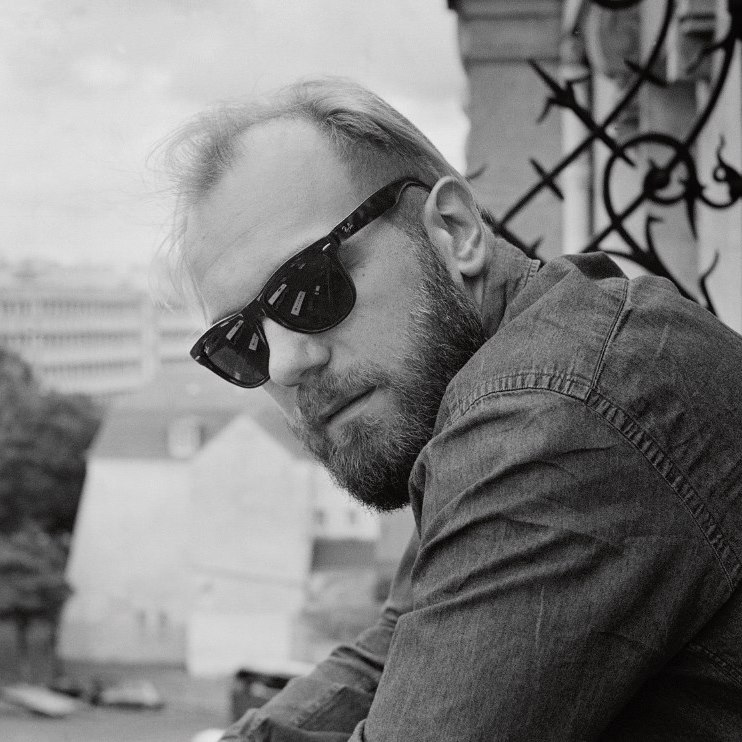
- Born: 1985 (age 40–41)
- Occupation: Photographer
- Known for: Architectural photography
- Website: www.julienlanoo.com

Julien Lanoo (born 1985) is a Belgian photographer whose work focuses primarily on architecture, urban environments and the built environment. His photographic practice examines architecture in relation to its inhabitants and to the social, historical and geographic context of a place.

In 2016, three of Lanoo's photographs were shortlisted for the Arcaid Images Architectural Photography Awards. His first monographic exhibition, In[Cognitus], was presented at the WAAO Centre for Architecture and Urbanism in Lille in 2018 as part of the Transphotographiques festival. In 2019, his work received a recognition (Anerkennung) in the European Architectural Photography Prize architekturbild, organized in cooperation with the Deutsches Architekturmuseum. In 2021, Julien Lanoo Studio won the Photography Studio specialization of the inaugural Architizer A+Firm Awards. In 2025, Lanoo received the Créateurs Design Award for Best Project Photography for Surf Ghana Busua.

== Career and photographic practice ==
Lanoo's work developed around architecture, urbanism and the documentation of the built environment. In a 2017 profile and interview, designboom described him as a Belgian photographer known for documenting the built environment while including the people who define a location. His photographs have included architecture in Europe, Africa and Asia, and projects by practices including Herzog & de Meuron and LAN.

Lanoo has described his approach as one in which architecture is understood through more than its formal appearance. His photography considers the users of buildings, their surroundings, geography, function, nature and the atmosphere of a place as elements of architectural interpretation. In an interview with Kontextur, he described photography as a means of constructing a coherent visual narrative from the multiple levels through which architecture can be understood.

His practice includes both digital and analogue photography. Lanoo has related his photographic process to his early experience working with film, darkroom printing and scanning, and has argued against applying a uniform photographic style to different architectural projects. Architizer has described his work as engaging with historical and social layers of architecture and with relationships between nature, light and materiality.

A recurring element of Lanoo's work is the presence of inhabitants and everyday activity within architectural photographs. Rather than treating buildings only as isolated formal objects, his images often situate architecture within the life and circumstances surrounding it.

== Exhibitions and cultural work ==
In 2018, the WAAO Centre for Architecture and Urbanism in Lille presented In[Cognitus], Lanoo's first monographic exhibition, as part of the Transphotographiques photography festival. The exhibition focused on the relationship between people and the built environment.

That year, Lanoo also participated with architect Julien De Smedt in a public discussion at the Cité de l'architecture et du patrimoine in Paris devoted to the book Built Unbuilt and to their documentation of sixteen years of architectural projects.

In 2019, Lanoo received a recognition in the European Architectural Photography Prize architekturbild. The award exhibition opened at the Deutsches Architekturmuseum in Frankfurt.

Architizer has reported that Lanoo's photographs have also been exhibited in contexts including the Venice Architecture Biennale, the Chicago Architecture Biennial, the Cité de l'architecture et du patrimoine in Paris and the Deutsches Architekturmuseum.

== Awards and recognition ==
In 2016, three photographs by Lanoo were among the twenty images shortlisted for the Arcaid Images Architectural Photography Awards. His photograph of Independence Square in Accra was shortlisted in the Buildings in Use category; his photograph of Herzog & de Meuron's Vitra Schaudepot in Weil am Rhein was shortlisted in the Exteriors category; and his photograph of the Haduwa Arts & Culture Institute in Ghana was shortlisted in the Sense of Place category.

In 2019, Lanoo received a recognition in the European Architectural Photography Prize architekturbild, presented in cooperation with the Deutsches Architekturmuseum and the Bundesstiftung Baukultur.

In 2021, Julien Lanoo Studio received the Photography Studio specialization award in the inaugural Architizer A+Firm Awards. Architizer subsequently included the studio in its selection of leading architectural photography studios.

In 2025, Lanoo won the Créateurs Design Award for Best Project Photography for Surf Ghana Busua.

== Selected publications ==
- De Smedt, Julien. Built Unbuilt. Photography by Julien Lanoo. Amsterdam: Frame Publishers, 2017. ISBN 978-94-92311-13-9.
- 3F présente, 25 quartiers renouvelés. Photography by Julien Lanoo. AHA Éditions, 2015. ISBN 979-10-95126-00-3.
- The Vitra Campus: Architecture Design Industry. Photography by Julien Lanoo. Vitra Design Museum, 2020. ISBN 978-3-945852-35-4.
- Jallon, Benoît; Napolitano, Umberto. Traces: LAN (Local Architecture Network). Photography by Julien Lanoo. Actar Publishers, 2013. ISBN 978-1-940291-02-4.
