= Justice: What's the Right Thing to Do? =

2009 book by Michael Sandel

- Author: Michael Sandel
- Language: English
- Subject: Political philosophy
- Published: 2009
- Publication place: United States
- Media type: Print

Justice: What's the Right Thing to Do? is a 2009 book on political philosophy by Michael J. Sandel.

== Background ==
The work was written to accompany Sandel's "Justice" course at Harvard University, which he has taught for more than thirty years and which has been offered online and in various TV summary versions. There is also an accompanying sourcebook of readings: Justice: A Reader.

== Summary ==
Sandel addresses a series of alternative theories of justice. The utilitarianism of Jeremy Bentham is outlined and criticised and then John Stuart Mill's refinements are discussed. The libertarians, in particular Robert Nozick, and their arguments are discussed. Then Sandel discusses Immanuel Kant and his 'categorical imperative'. The discussion then goes on to John Rawls's work. Then Aristotle and the concept of 'telos' is discussed. It is here that Sandel begins to make clear his own perspective. He argues that justice, rather than being autonomous (as Kantians or Rawlsians might have it), has a goal: a form of communitarianism. Sandel quotes Alasdair MacIntyre and his characterisation of humans as being 'storytelling beings' who live their lives with narrative quests.

== Reception ==
Reviews have largely been positive. The New York Times praised Sandel's ability to teach and says, "If 'Justice' breaks no new philosophical ground, it succeeds at something perhaps no less important: in terms we can all understand, it confronts us with the concepts that lurk, so often unacknowledged, beneath our conflicts." The Guardian calls it a "timely plea for us to desist from political bickering and see if we can have a sensible discussion about what sort of society we really want to live in." The Portsmouth Review calls it an "enlightening read".
