= The Tyranny of Merit =

2020 book by Michael Sandel

The Tyranny of Merit: What's Become of the Common Good?
- Cover of the 2020 Farrar, Straus and Giroux edition
- Author: Michael Sandel
- Language: English
- Publication date: 2020

The Tyranny of Merit: What's Become of the Common Good? is a 2020 book by Michael J. Sandel. In the work, Sandel argues that the contemporary meritocratic system has created a polarized society by demeaning those without formal credentials and fostering hubris among the winners.

== Reception ==
Andrew Adonis, writing for the Literary Review, argues that Sandel's focus on credentials ignores the reality of governance. Adonis charges Sandel with inconsistency, simultaneously praising well-educated leaders while condemning elite credentials, and challenges his thesis that populism represents a revolt against meritocracy when leaders like Boris Johnson and Donald Trump themselves hail from privileged, highly credentialed backgrounds.

Elizabeth S. Anderson’s review of The Tyranny of Merit provides a "compelling" validation of Sandel's diagnosis while sharply criticizing his remedies as incomplete and socially regressive. She agrees that the Democratic Party’s obsession with credentialism and "smart" policy-making has alienated the working class, creating a "toxic economy of esteem" that fuels populist resentment. Anderson affirms Sandel's core argument: by treating a college degree as the only "gold pass" to a decent life, educated elites have effectively told the non-college-educated that their lack of success is their own fault, thereby destroying the social bonds and contributive justice necessary for a healthy democracy. However, Anderson argues that Sandel's focus on the "Brahmin Left" (the educated elite) allows the "Merchant Right" (the business elite) to escape accountability for the material degradation of labor. She contends that while meritocratic hubris is an insult, it is capitalist strategies—such as union-busting, wage theft, and the creation of "precarious gig work"—that have actually robbed workers of their power and dignity. Ultimately, she critiques Sandel's vision for being too nostalgic for a 20th-century model of the white "family wage," insisting that any real solution must be a 21st-century social-democratic agenda that empowers a diverse workforce through unions and democratic control of the workplace, rather than just shifting the attitudes of liberal elites.
