= Daniel Markovits =

American legal scholar

- Born: August 4, 1969 (age 57)
- Occupations: Law professor; author
- Known for: The Meritocracy Trap

Daniel Markovits (born August 4, 1969) is the Guido Calabresi Professor of Law at the Yale Law School and the founding director of the Yale Center for the Study of Private Law. He is the author of The Meritocracy Trap (2019).

== Education ==
After earning a B.A. in mathematics, summa cum laude, from Yale University, Markovits received a British Marshall Scholarship to study in England, where he was awarded an M.Sc. in econometrics and mathematical economics from the London School of Economics as well as a bachelor and doctorate in philosophy from the University of Oxford. Markovits then returned to Yale to study law and, after clerking for Guido Calabresi, joined the faculty.

== Career ==
At Yale, Markovits publishes on a range of disciplines, including on the philosophical foundations of private law, moral and political philosophy, and behavioral economics.

He delivered the 2015 commencement speech at the Yale Law School, in which he argued that "meritocracy now constitutes a modern-day aristocracy, one might even say, purpose-built for a world in which the greatest source of wealth is not land or factories but human capital, the free labor of skilled workers".

Markovits has also published a number of articles in The Atlantic.

=== The Meritocracy Trap ===
In 2019, Markovits published his third book, The Meritocracy Trap, in which he places meritocracy at the center of rising economic inequality and social and political dysfunction. The book takes up the law, economics, and politics of human capital to identify the mechanisms through which meritocracy breeds inequality, and to expose the burdens that meritocratic inequality imposes on all who fall within meritocracy's orbit. The book figured on the Amazon bestseller list and was widely praised. It was not universally well-received, however. Timothy Sandefur, writing for The Objective Standard, a libertarian journal, explains that "Markovits's prescription [for the problems he addresses] is for a society in which government will reward 'uncompetitive mediocrity' instead of individual initiative, and mankind's noblest quality—the love of excellence—is regarded as a menace". Further, Sandefur argues that "Markovits's reliance on...loaded language is a good sign that his argument cannot stand—pardon the pun—on its own merits".

== Selected publications ==
- A Modern Legal Ethics: Adversary Advocacy in a Democratic Age (2008)
- Contract Law and Legal Methods (Foundation Press – 2012)
- "The Distributional Preferences of an Elite", Science (2015)
- The Meritocracy Trap (Penguin Press – 2019)
