= Ezra Stoller =

American photographer

- Born: May 16, 1915; Chicago, Illinois, US
- Died: October 29, 2004 (aged 89); Williamstown, Massachusetts, US
- Occupation: Architectural photographer
- Children: 3

Ezra Stoller (16 May 1915 – 29 October 2004) was an American architectural photographer.

== Early life ==
Stoller was born in Chicago, Illinois, but was raised and schooled in New York. His interest in photography began while he was an architecture student at New York University, when he began making lantern slides and photographs of architectural models, drawings and sculpture. After his graduation in 1938, with a BFA in Industrial Design, he concentrated on photography.

== Career ==
Stoller worked with the photographer Paul Strand in the Office of emergency management in 1940/1. He was drafted in 1942 and deployed at the Army Signal Corps Photo Center where he taught photography. Concurrent with his work at the Signal Corp, he served on the editorial board and is listed as part owner of the newly launched (1941) architecture journal, Task from 1943 to 1945.

After WW2 he resumed work as an architectural photographer and worked with the leading architects of the day. His work featured landmarks of modern architecture, including Ludwig Mies van der Rohe's Seagram Building, Frank Lloyd Wright's Fallingwater, Alvar Aalto's Finnish Pavilion at the 1939 New York World's Fair, and Eero Saarinen's last project Bell Labs Holmdel Complex. Stoller is often cited in aiding the spread of the Modern Movement. Among architects, his name was sometimes used as a verb; to have a design “Stollerized” was seen as a great honour.

In 1961, he was the first recipient of a Gold Medal for Photography from the American Institute of Architects and he was awarded an Honorary Doctorate of Fine Arts by Pratt Institute in 1998. Photographs are featured in the books Modern Architecture: Photographs by Ezra Stoller and Ezra Stoller, Photographer. His work was published in Architectural Record, Architectural Forum, Fortune, House & Garden, and House Beautiful, amongst other magazines and his photographs appeared in many books. Works by Stoller are held in various collections, for example, the San Francisco Museum of Modern Art and the Whitney Museum of American Art, and photographs attributed to Stoller are held in the Conway Library at The Courtauld Institute of Art in London whose archive, of primarily architectural images, is being digitised under the wider Courtauld Connects programme.

In the 1960s Stoller founded Esto Photographics, a commercial photography firm that was run by his daughter Erica Stoller, until it was sold to an employee in the early 2020s. Stoller's son Evan Stoller is an architect and designer of a line of architecturally influenced modern furniture called Stoller Works.

== Death ==
He died in Williamstown, Massachusetts, on 29 October 2004, from complications of a stroke.

== Exhibitions ==
Solo exhibits

Max Protetch Gallery, New York, 1980
James Danziger Gallery, New York, 1998
James Danziger Gallery, New York, 1999
Rolf Ricke Gallery, Cologne, 2000
Ariel Meyerowitz Gallery, New York, 2001
Henry Urbach Architecture Gallery, New York, 2002
Henry Urbach Architecture Gallery, New York, 2004
Williams College Museum of Art, Williamstown MA, 2004
Danziger Projects, Summer 2007
Yossi Milo Gallery, New York, 2011

Group exhibits

Canadian Centre for Architecture, Montreal
San Francisco Museum of Modern Art, San Francisco

== Selected publications ==
- The John Hancock Center, photographs by Ezra Stoller; introduction by Yasmin Sabina Khan, New York : Princeton Architectural Press, 2000, ISBN 1568982593
- The TWA Terminal, photographs by Ezra Stoller; introduction by Mark Lamster, New York : Princeton Architectural Press, 1999, ISBN 1568981821
- The Yale Art + Architecture Building, photographs by Ezra Stoller; introduction by Philip Nobel, New York : Princeton Architectural Press, 1999, ISBN 1568981856
- Frank Lloyd Wright's Taliesin West, photographs by Ezra Stoller; introduction by Neil Levine, New York : Princeton Architectural Press, 1999, ISBN 156898202X
- Frank Lloyd Wright's Fallingwater, photographs by Ezra Stoller; introduction by Neil Levine, New York : Princeton Architectural Press, 1999, ISBN 1568982038
- Guggenheim New York, photographs by Ezra Stoller. Guggenheim Bilbao, photographs by Jeff Goldberg, New York : Princeton Architectural Press, 1999, ISBN 1568981937
- The Seagram Building, photographs by Ezra Stoller; introduction by Franz Schulze, New York : Princeton Architectural Press, 1999, ISBN 1568982011
- The Salk Institute, photographs by Ezra Stoller; introduction by Daniel S. Friedman, New York : Princeton Architectural Press, 1999,ISBN 1568982003
- The United Nations, photographs by Ezra Stoller; introduction by Jane C. Loeffler, New York : Princeton Architectural Press, 1999, ISBN 156898183X
- The Chapel of Ronchamp : Le Corbusier's Notre-Dame-du-Haut, photographs by Ezra Stoller; introduction by Eugenia Bell, New York : Princeton Architectural Press, 1999, ISBN 1568981848
- Modern Architecture; Photographs by Ezra Stoller, ed. William Saunders, New York; London : Harry N. Abrams, 1999, ISBN 0810938162
- The Galveston That Was, Howard Barnstone; photographs by Henri Cartier-Bresson and Ezra Stoller; foreword by James Johnson Sweeney; afterword by Peter Brink, College Station; Great Britain : Texas A&M University Press; Houston : Museum of Fine Arts, 1999, ISBN 089096887X
