= Michael Sandel =

American political philosopher (born 1953)

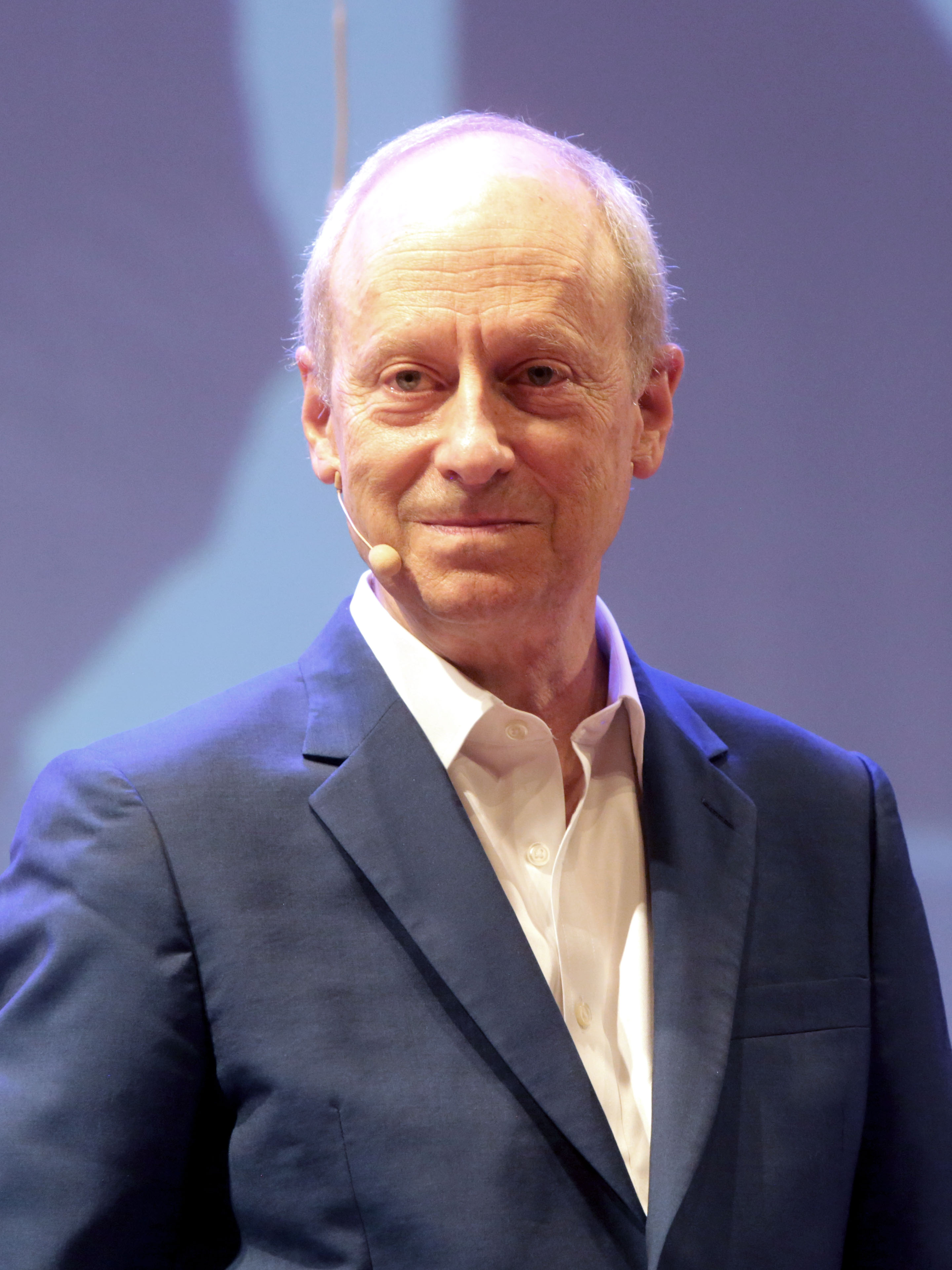
- Sandel in 2023
- Born: Michael Joseph Sandel; March 5, 1953 (age 73); Minneapolis, Minnesota, U.S.
- Spouse: Kiku Adatto
- Children: 2
- Awards: American Academy of Arts and Sciences (2002); Berggruen Prize for Philosophy and Culture (2025)

Education
- Education: Brandeis University (BA); Balliol College, Oxford (DPhil)
- Thesis: Liberalism and the Problem of the Moral Subject (1980)
- Doctoral advisor: Charles Taylor

Philosophical work
- Era: Contemporary philosophy
- Region: Western philosophy
- School: Analytic; communitarianism
- Institutions: Harvard University
- Doctoral students: Yascha Mounk
- Notable students: Ketanji Brown Jackson
- Main interests: Political philosophy; jurisprudence; ethics
- Notable works: Liberalism and the Limits of Justice (1982); Justice: What's the Right Thing to Do? (2009)
- Notable ideas: Communitarian critique of liberalism
- Sandel's voice Recorded June 2009 from the BBC Radio 4 programme the Reith Lectures.

Michael Joseph Sandel (/sænˈdɛl/; born March 5, 1953) is an American political philosopher. He is the Anne T. and Robert M. Bass Professor of Government at Harvard University, where his course Justice was the university's first course to be made freely available online and on television. It has been viewed by tens of millions of people around the world, including in China, where Sandel was named the 2011 "most influential foreign figure of the year" (China Newsweek).

He is known for his critique of John Rawls' A Theory of Justice in his first book, Liberalism and the Limits of Justice (1982). He was elected a Fellow of the American Academy of Arts and Sciences in 2002.

== Early life and education ==
Michael Joseph Sandel was born in Minneapolis, Minnesota, on March 5, 1953, into a Jewish family. They moved to Los Angeles when he was thirteen. He was president of his senior class at Palisades High School and graduated Phi Beta Kappa from Brandeis University with a B.A. in politics in 1975. As a Rhodes Scholar, he received his doctorate in politics from Balliol College, Oxford, in 1985, studying under philosopher Charles Taylor.

== Teaching ==
=== Justice ===
Sandel joined the Faculty of Arts and Sciences at Harvard University in 1981. He has taught the Justice course at Harvard University for two decades. More than 15,000 students have taken the course, making it one of the most highly attended in Harvard's history. The fall 2005 course was recorded and is offered online for students through the Harvard Extension School. The fall 2007 class was the largest ever at Harvard, with a total of 1,115 students.

An abridged form of this recording is now a 12-episode television series, Justice: What's the Right Thing to Do?, in a co-production of WGBH and Harvard University. Episodes are available on the Justice with Michael Sandel website. There is an accompanying book, Justice: What's the Right Thing to Do? and the sourcebook of readings Justice: A Reader.

The popularity of the show is attributed to the discussion-oriented format (the Socratic method)—rather than recitation and memorization of facts—and to Sandel's engaging style, incorporating context into discussion; for example, he starts one lecture with a discussion of the ethics of ticket scalping.

The BBC broadcast eight 30-minute segments from the series on BBC Four starting on 25 January 2011.

In April 2012, BBC Radio 4 broadcast a three-part series and later, a podcast presented by Sandel entitled The Public Philosopher. These followed a format similar to the Justice lectures, this time recorded in front of an audience at the London School of Economics. Across three programs, Sandel debates with the audience whether universities should give preference to students from poorer backgrounds, whether a nurse should be paid more than a banker, and whether it is right to bribe people to be healthy.

=== edX ===
On April 29, 2013, the philosophy department faculty of San Jose State University addressed an open letter to Sandel protesting the use of MOOCs (massively open online courses) such as his Justice course. Sandel publicly responded: "The worry that the widespread use of online courses will damage departments in public universities facing budgetary pressures is a legitimate concern that deserves serious debate, at edX and throughout higher education. The last thing I want is for my online lectures to be used to undermine faculty colleagues at other institutions." As of 2025, Sandel continues teaching his Justice course on edX.

=== Other teaching ===
Sandel collaborates with Douglas Melton in teaching the seminar, "Ethics and Biotechnology", which considers the ethical implications of a variety of biotechnological procedures and possibilities.

== Philosophical views ==
Sandel subscribes to a certain version of communitarianism, and in this vein he is perhaps best known for his critique of John Rawls's A Theory of Justice. Rawls's argument depends on the assumption of the veil of ignorance, which Sandel argues commits Rawls to a view of people as "unencumbered selves". Sandel's view is that we are by nature encumbered to an extent that makes it impossible even hypothetically to have such a veil.

Some examples of such ties are those with our families, which we do not make by conscious choice, but are born with, already attached. Because they are not consciously acquired, it is impossible to separate oneself from such ties. Sandel believes that only a less-restrictive, looser version of the veil of ignorance should be postulated. Criticism such as that of Sandel inspired Rawls to subsequently argue that his theory of justice was not a "metaphysical" theory, but a "political" one, a basis on which an overriding consensus could be formed among individuals and groups with many different moral and political views.

== Politics ==
According to the British left-leaning newspaper The Guardian in 2020, Sandel's politics are "squarely on the left". According to an interviewer from the newspaper: "In 2012, he added intellectual lustre to Ed Miliband's renewal project for the Labour Party, speaking to that year's party conference on the moral limits of markets... [and] helped inspire Miliband’s critique of 'predatory capitalism'".

== Authorship ==
Sandel is the author of several publications, including Democracy's Discontent and Public Philosophy. In the former, Sandel writes that the discontent takes "the form of inchoate anxieties—a growing sense that we were losing control of the forces that govern our lives, and that the moral fabric of community was unraveling. As the global economy mattered more, the nation-state, traditionally the site of self-government, mattered less. The scale of economic life was exceeding the reach of democratic control". Public Philosophy is a collection of his previously published essays examining the role of morality and justice in American political life. In it, he offers a commentary on the roles of moral values and civic community in the American electoral process—a much-debated aspect of the 2004 U.S. election cycle and of current political discussion.

Sandel gave the 2009 Reith Lectures on "A New Citizenship" on BBC Radio, addressing the "prospect for a new politics of the common good". The lectures were delivered in London on May 18, Oxford on May 21, Newcastle upon Tyne on May 26, and Washington, D.C. in early June, 2009.

He is the author of the book, What Money Can't Buy: The Moral Limits of Markets (2012), which argues that some desirable things—such as body organs and the right to kill endangered species—should not be traded for cash. In the book, Sandel argues that stimulating a market-oriented approach in people may lead to relaxation or even corruption of their moral values.

In his 2020 book, The Tyranny of Merit, Sandel makes a case for overhauling western neo-liberalism, citing Michael Young's work as a precedent (Young popularized the term "meritocracy"), and developing a line of thought shared with Daniel Markovits in The Meritocracy Trap. According to Sandel, elite institutions including the Ivy League and Wall Street have corrupted our virtue and our sense of who deserves power. Ongoing stalled social mobility and increasing inequality are laying bare the crass delusion of the American Dream, and the promise "you can make it if you want and try". The latter, according to Sandel, is the main culprit of the anger and frustration that brought some Western countries toward populism.

Among various reviews of the 2020 book, the Evening Standard headline was "Diagnosis but no cure for the ills of an unfair society", in Kirkus Reviews "Sandel’s proposals for change are less convincing than his deeply considered analysis."; in the British Education Studies Association, "We must abandon the elitism of the university degree... Of course, higher education is a good thing, even ‘a common good’. But the university should return to its role of defining and creating knowledge, not credits."

In the Harvard Magazine review, "But even if equality of opportunity were attainable, which Sandel doubts, he thinks meritocracy would be neither desirable nor sustainable: even a perfect meritocracy has multiple flaws that make it unjust."; The Wall Street Journal headlines: "Review: The Cream Also Rises: The meritocratic ideal makes elites arrogant and threatens communal solidarity. Identity-based policies make the problem worse."

In 2009, Sandel criticized economist Gary Becker, winner of the Sveriges Riksbank Prize in honor of Alfred Nobel for his market immigration proposal.

== Personal life ==
Sandel is married to fellow Harvard professor Kiku Adatto.

== Public service ==
Sandel served on the George W. Bush administration's President's Council on Bioethics.

== Awards and honors ==
- 1985: Harvard-Radcliffe Phi Beta Kappa Teaching Prize
- 2012: Financial Times and Goldman Sachs Business Book of the Year Award, shortlist, What Money Can't Buy: The Moral Limits of Markets
- 2012: Foreign Policy magazine Top Global Thinker
- 2014: Honorary doctorate, Utrecht University
- 2018: Premio Princesa de Asturias de las Ciencias Sociales
- 2023: Honorary doctorate, Radboud University
- 2025: Berggruen Prize for Philosophy and Culture

== Publications ==
External videos
- Booknotes interview with Sandel on Democracy's Discontent, May 19, 1996, C-SPAN
- Presentation by Sandel on Democracy’s Discontent, February 26, 1997, C-SPAN
- Presentation by Sandel on Public Philosophy, February 23, 2006, C-SPAN
- Presentation by Sandel on Justice: What's the Right Thing to Do?, November 9, 2009, C-SPAN
- After Words interview with Sandel on What Money Can't Buy, April 13, 2012, C-SPAN
- Presentation by Sandel on What Money Can't Buy, November 17, 2012, C-SPAN

- Democracy's Discontent: A New Edition for Our Perilous Times. Cambridge, Massachusetts: Harvard University Press. 2022. ISBN 978-0-674-27071-8.
- Liberalism and the Limits of Justice. Cambridge, UK New York: Cambridge University Press. 1998. ISBN 978-0-521-56741-1.
  - French translation: Le libéralisme et les limites de la justice. Paris: Editions du Seuil. 1999. ISBN 978-2-02-032630-8.
  - Spanish translation: El liberalismo y los límites de la justicia. Barcelona: Gedisa. 2000. ISBN 978-84-7432-706-9.
- Public Philosophy: Essays on Morality in Politics. Cambridge, Massachusetts: Harvard University Press. 2005. ISBN 978-0-674-02365-9.
- The Case Against Perfection: Ethics in the Age of Genetic Engineering. Cambridge, Massachusetts: Belknap Press of Harvard University Press. 2007. ISBN 978-0-674-01927-0.
  - German translation: Plädoyer gegen die Perfektion : Ethik im Zeitalter der genetischen Technik. Berlin: Berlin Univ. Press. 2008. ISBN 978-3-940432-14-8.
  - Spanish translation: Contra la perfección. Barcelona: Marbot. 2013. ISBN 978-84-935744-4-4.
- Justice: A Reader. Oxford New York: Oxford University Press. 2007. ISBN 978-0-19-533512-5.
- Justice: What's the Right Thing to Do?. New York: Farrar, Straus and Giroux. 2010. ISBN 978-0-374-53250-5.
  - Translated into Chinese, German, Spanish, French, Greek, Japanese, Korean, Portuguese, Russian, and Vietnamese editions; see the article on the book for the full citations.
- What Money Can't Buy: The Moral Limits of Markets. New York: Farrar, Straus and Giroux. 2012. ISBN 978-0-374-20303-0.
  - German translation: Was man für Geld nicht kaufen kann: die moralischen Grenzen des Marktes. Berlin: Ullstein. 2012. ISBN 978-3-550-08026-5.
  - French translation: Ce que l'argent ne saurait acheter: les limites morales du marché. Paris: Editions du Seuil. 2014. ISBN 978-2-02-117323-9.
  - Also translated into Spanish and other languages.
- The Tyranny of Merit: What's Become of the Common Good?. Farrar, Straus and Giroux. 2020. ISBN 978-0-374-28998-0.

== See also ==
- American philosophy
- List of American philosophers
