= Julius Shulman =

American architectural photographer

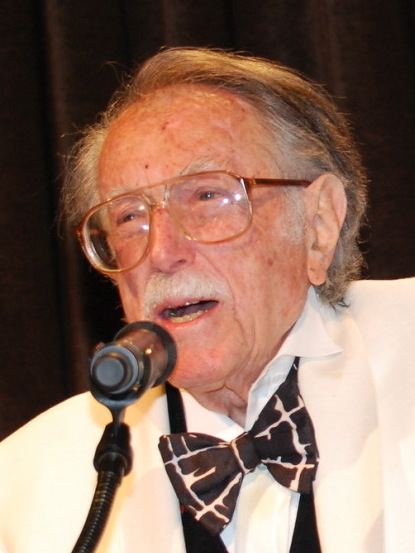
- Shulman in 2007
- Born: October 10, 1910; Brooklyn, New York, United States
- Died: July 15, 2009 (aged 98); Los Angeles, California, United States
- Occupations: Architectural photographer, environmentalist
- Years active: 1936–2009
- Spouse(s): Emma (1937–1973, her death); Olga (1976–1999, her death)
- Children: 1

Julius Shulman (October 10, 1910 – July 15, 2009) was an American architectural photographer best known for his photograph "Case Study House #22, Los Angeles, 1960. Pierre Koenig, Architect." The house is also known as the Stahl House. Shulman's photography spread the aesthetic of California's Mid-century modern architecture around the world. Through his many books, exhibits and personal appearances his work ushered in a new appreciation for the movement beginning in the 1990s.

Much of his vast library of images currently resides at the Getty Center in Los Angeles. The main archive was acquired from Shulman and his daughter in 2004, and another 290 items were acquired in 2011. Selected photographs have been digitized.

Shulman's contemporaries include Ezra Stoller and Hedrich Blessing Photographers. In 1947, Julius Shulman asked architect Raphael Soriano to build a mid-century steel home and studio in the Hollywood Hills.

Some of his architectural photographs, like the iconic shots of Frank Lloyd Wright's or Pierre Koenig's remarkable structures, have been published countless times. The brilliance of buildings like those by Charles Eames, as well as those of his close friends, Richard Neutra and Raphael Soriano, was first brought to wider attention by Shulman's photography. The clarity of his work added to the idea that architectural photography be considered as an independent art form in which perception and understanding for the buildings and their place in the landscape informs the photograph.

Many of the buildings photographed by Shulman have since been demolished or re-purposed, lending to the popularity of his images.

== Life and career ==
Julius Shulman was born in Brooklyn to Ukrainian-Jewish parents on October 10, 1910, and grew up on a small farm in Connecticut before moving to Los Angeles while still a boy. He briefly attended the University of California, Los Angeles and the University of California, Berkeley, and earned pocket money by selling his photographs to fellow students. In 1936 he returned to Los Angeles, where he was enlisted by a friend, working as a draftsman for Neutra, to take photographs of a new, Neutra-designed Kun Residence in Hollywood with his amateur Vest Pocket Kodak camera. When Neutra saw the pictures, he asked to meet the photographer and proceeded to give him his first assignments which assisted Shulman in launching his career in architectural photography. Shulman opened a studio in Los Angeles in 1950, by that time drawing much of his work from magazines based in New York. He remained in business full-time until the late 1980s. In 2000, Shulman gave up retirement to begin working with business partner Juergen Nogai.

== Exhibitions ==
The Getty Research Institute held a 2005–2006 exhibition of Shulman's prints entitled "Julius Shulman, Modernity and the Metropolis". The exhibition included sections entitled "Framing the California Lifestyle," "Promoting the Power of Modern Architecture," "The Tools of an Innovator" and "The Development of a Metropolis". The exhibition traveled to the National Building Museum and to the Art Institute of Chicago.

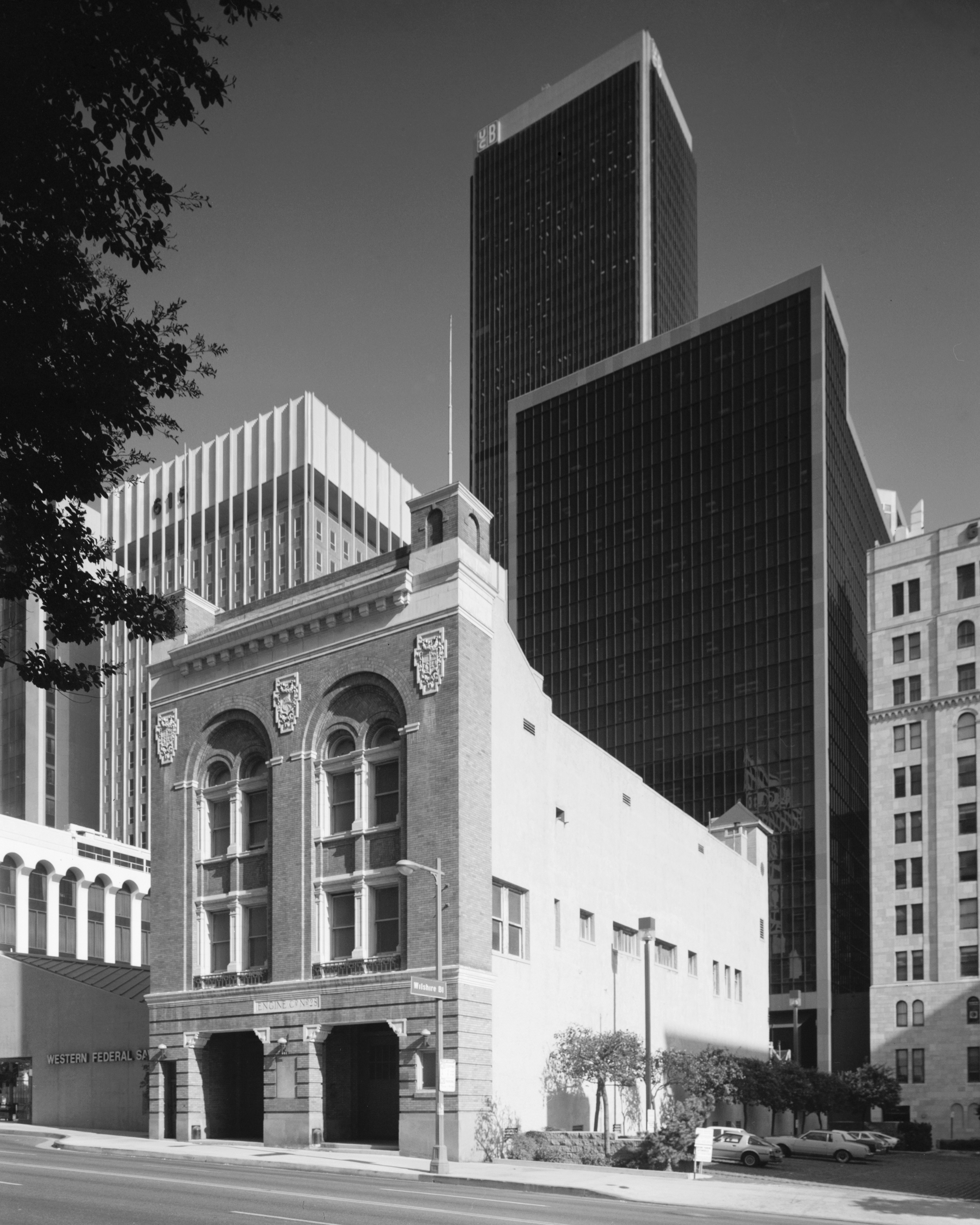
Los Angeles California Fire Station No. 28 by Julius Shulman

Julius Shulman and Juergen Nogai have had exhibitions at the Design and Architecture Museum in Frankfurt, Germany, in fall 2005 as well as an exhibition at the Barnsdall Municipal Gallery in Los Angeles 2006, Craig Krull Gallery Bergamot Station, Los Angeles, October 2007, and another show in spring 2009. An exhibition of their work is also scheduled in Mannheim, Germany, in 2010.

On December 16, 2007, Shulman attended a showing of his architectural photography at the Los Angeles Public Library. Organized by the Getty Research Institute, the exhibit included 150 photographs documenting architectural changes in Los Angeles over the past 80 years. This progression includes the redevelopment of Bunker Hill, the growth of Century City, the avant-garde architectural designs in Los Angeles such as Watts Towers, Grauman's Chinese Theatre and the Getty Villa, as well as the growth of Wilshire Boulevard. The exhibition features the industrial engines at the Port of Los Angeles and the Los Angeles International Airport that helped fuel the growth of Los Angeles. Also featured, diverse residential fabric from Echo Park to South Los Angeles. The exhibit spotlighted Shulman's unique role in capturing and promoting innovative, sleek case study houses as well as the contrasting tract housing developments with repeated floor plans.

In February 2008, the Palm Springs Art Museum presented "Julius Shulman: Palm Springs," guest curated by Michael Stern. Containing more than 200 objects, it is the largest Julius Shulman exhibition ever presented to date. In addition to photographs and renderings, illustrations and models of many of the buildings Shulman photographed were presented to complement his extensive documentation of a place that was so inspirational to him. Rizzoli published the accompanying catalog, "Julius Shulman: Palm Springs." Additionally, a documentary DVD was produced in conjunction with the exhibition "Julius Shulman: Desert Modern."

Selected Shulman works were included in The Annenberg Space for Photography's inaugural exhibit, Los Angeles. One of his last commissioned works was of the Space, which opened in March, 2009, with Shulman in attendance.

Shulman's last exhibition was scheduled for July 4 to August 8, 2009, but his death one week into the show caused it to be extended by two weeks. Shulman's daughter Judy Shulman McKee—along with Krull, Nogai, Benedikt Taschen and Wim de Wit—spoke at the Getty Center on Sunday, September 20, 2009 during a memorial to celebrate the life of Julius Shulman.

== Film ==
Huell Howser Productions, in association with KCET/Los Angeles, featured Shulman in Julius Shulman – Palm Springs.

Shulman was the subject of a 2008 documentary film, Visual Acoustics: The Modernism of Julius Shulman. The film, directed by Eric Bricker and narrated by Dustin Hoffman, explores Shulman's life and work. It discusses how Shulman's images helped to shape the careers of influential 20th-century architects, including Frank Lloyd Wright, Richard Neutra and John Lautner. The film won the 2009 Palm Springs International Film Festival Audience Award for Best Documentary Feature, as well as awards at the Austin Film Festival, the Newport Beach Film Festival, and the Lone Star International Film Festival. The film was released theatrically by Arthouse Films across the U.S. late 2009 through early 2010.

== Death and honors ==
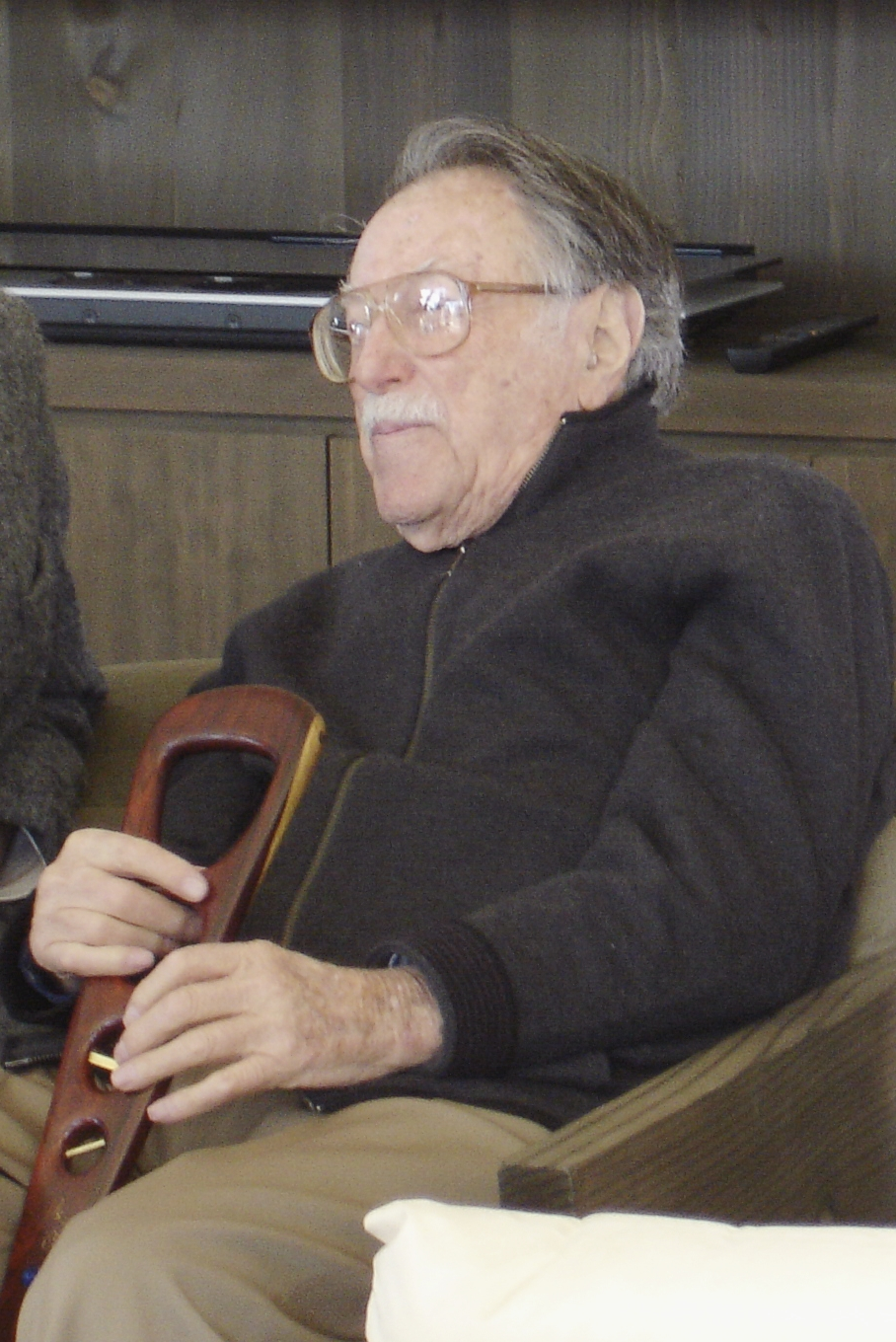
Shulman in 2006.

In 1987, the Shulman House was designated a Cultural Heritage Monument by the city of Los Angeles. Shulman himself had a Golden Palm Star on the Palm Springs Walk of Stars dedicated to him in 2006. He died at his home in Los Angeles, California on July 15, 2009; he was 98 years old. He was buried at Hillside Memorial Park Cemetery in Culver City, California.

== Bibliography ==
- Goessel, Peter (1998). Julius Shulman: Architektur und Fotografie. Cologne: Benedikt Taschen Verlag Gmbh. ISBN 3-8228-7305-5
- Head, Jeffrey (Summer 2007). “Shulman face to face” (interview with Julius Shulman), CA Modern magazine, pp. 16–17
- Head, Jeffrey (Summer 2006). "A Conversation with Julius Shulman”, Case Study House #21, pp. 9–12. Chicago, IL: Richard Wright
- Leet, Stephen (2004). Richard Neutra's Miller House. New York, NY: Princeton Architectural Press. ISBN 978-1568982748. LCCN 2003-21531.OCLC 473973008
- Rosa, Joseph (2004). A Constructed View: The Architectural Photography of Julius Shulman. New York, NY: Rizzoli International. ISBN 978-0847817771.
- Shulman, Julius; Stern, Michael; Hess, Alan (2008). Julius Shulman: Palm Springs. New York, NY: Rizzoli International. p. 208. ISBN 978-0-8478-3113-5.
- Stern, Michael (February 2008). "Julius Shulman: The Man Behind the Camera", Palm Springs Life, pp. 80–91
