= Hedrich Blessing Photographers =

Architectural photography firm (1929–2017)

Hedrich Blessing Photographers (also Hedrich-Blessing) was an architectural photography firm established in Chicago in 1929 by partners Ken Hedrich and Henry Blessing. The Chicago History Museum houses the archive of the first 50 years of photography (1929–1979), where it is available for viewing by the public. Hedrich Blessing collaborated with architects and designers both nationally and internationally but also undertook non-architectural work; industrial, product, editorial, and corporate photography.

== History ==
The firm was founded by 21 year old photographer Ken Hedrich, who had studied his craft at the New York Institute of Photography, and his business partner Henry Blessing. Blessing left the business in 1931 but it retained its name Hedrich-Blessing with its new partners being two of Ken Hedrich’s brothers, Ed and Bill Hedrich who joined the firm in 1930 and 1931 respectively. They were later joined by their youngest brother Jack Hedrich who was an administrator and president for 40 odd years.

“Don’t make photographs, think them” was a pronouncement by Ken Hedrich that became the motto of the firm which became famous for its innovative architectural photographs capturing the spirit of buildings. As Jack Hedrich said '”They were really the first ones to change architectural photography from reporting images to artistic images”. In 1937, Architectural Forum commissioned Hedrich-Blessing to photograph recent works of Frank Lloyd Wright and Ken and Bill Hedrich formed a lifelong association with Wright. The studio became associated with documenting the modern architecture movement, for example, the work of Ludwig Mies Van Der Rohe, Albert Kahn, Buckminster Fuller, Eero Saarinen, Minoru Yamasaki, Harry Weese and Skidmore, Owings & Merrill.

Hedrich-Blessing remained a family-run business until the retirement of Jim Hedrich, son of Ken Hedrich, in 2003. The studio finally closed in 2017 when two of the firm’s principal photographers formed Hall + Merrick Photographers which now trades under the name of Hall + Merrick + McCaugherty.

As well as the large archive of photographs owned by the Chicago Historical Society and housed at the Chicago History Museum, photographs are also held in the photographic archive of The University of Chicago, the Prints and Photographs Division, Library of Congress, Washington, D.C. and in the Conway Library, The Courtauld Institute of Art, London.

== List of Photographers ==
Listed in chronological order including time on camera.

- Ken Hedrich, 1929–1971
- Bill Hedrich, 1931–1988
- Giovanni Suter, 1938–1972
- Hube Henry, 1945–1964
- Bill Engdahl, 1948–1985
- Bob Harr, 1952–2008
- Jim Hedrich, 1966–2005
- Bob Porth, 1968–1988
- Bob Shimer, 1969–2008
- Nick Merrick, 1977–2017
- Jon Miller, 1979–2017
- Sandi Hedrich, 1981–1988
- Scott McDonald, 1983–2015
- Marco Lorenzetti, 1985–1998
- Steve Hall, 1985–2017
- Chris Barrett, 1991–2008
- Craig Dugan, 1993–2009
- Jeff Millies, 1998-2008
- Kate Joyce, 2007-2010
- Dave Burk, 2009–2015
- Tom Harris 2012-2015

== Presidents ==
Listed chronologically and with dates of tenure.

- Ed Hedrich 1931-1976
- Jack Hedrich 1953-1993
- Mike Houlahan 1986-2004
- Nick Merrick 2004-2010
- Jon Miller 2010–2016
- Steve Hall 2016–2017

== Publications ==
- The Architectural Photography of Hedrich-Blessing, edited and with an introduction by Robert A. Sobieszek, Holt, Rinehart and Winston (1984) ISBN 0-03-061554-2
- Building Images : Seventy Years of Photography at Hedrich Blessing, essay by Tony Hiss; introduction by Timothy Samuelson, Chronicle Books (2000) ISBN 0-8118-2657-0

== Building images ==
In 2000-2001 the Chicago History Museum held an exhibition displaying images from the first 70 years of architectural photography from Hedrich Blessing. The exhibition drew from over 400,000 prints and negatives from more than 40,000 assignments spanning 7 decades.

=== Selection of other exhibitions ===
- 1987 Hedrich-Blessing Architectural Photography, images from the 1930s and `40s, Edwynn Houk Gallery, Chicago
- 2008 Hedrich Blessing Interiors: Architectural Photography of the 1930s, ArchiTech Gallery
- 2021 Hedrich Blessing Photographers‘ new exhibition, entitled “Building on Tradition,” at the bulthaup Chicago showroom, showcasing a collection of the studio’s recent architecture and interior design photographs by Dave Burk, Steve Hall, Tom Harris, Scott McDonald, Nick Merrick, and Jon Miller
