= Architectural photography =

Photography genre

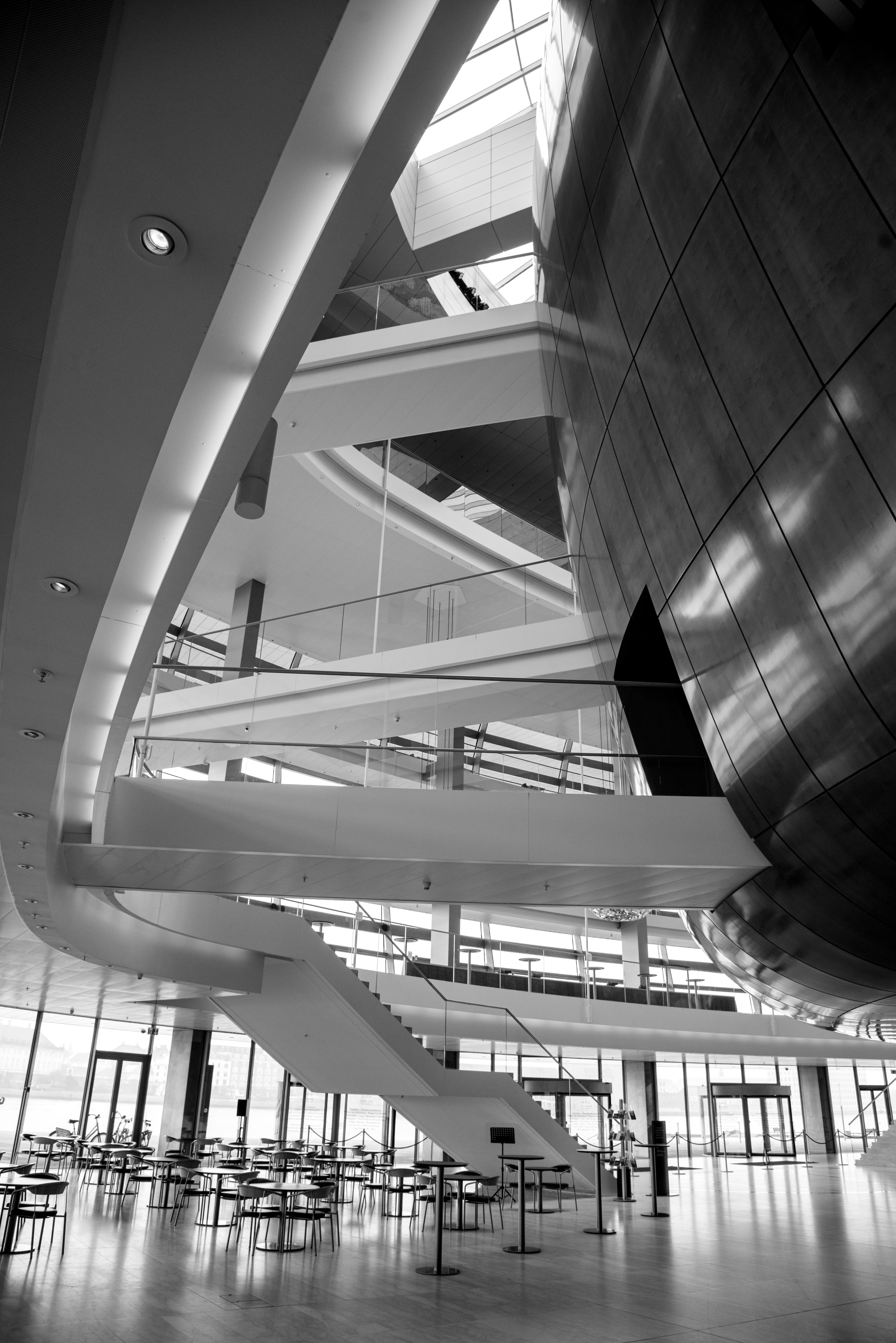
Copenhagen Opera House, 2018

Architectural photography is the subgenre of the photography discipline where the primary emphasis is made to capturing photographs of buildings and similar architectural structures that are both aesthetically pleasing and accurate in terms of representations of their subjects. Architectural photographers are usually skilled in the use of specialized techniques and cameras for producing such specialized photography.

== History ==
Throughout the history of photography, architectural structures including buildings have been highly valued photographic subjects, mirroring society's appreciation for architecture and its cultural significance. By the 1860s, architectural photography started to become an established visual medium.

The first permanent photograph, View from the Window at Le Gras by Nicéphore Niépce, was also the first architectural photograph as it was a view of buildings. Similarly, photographs taken by early photographer William Henry Fox Talbot were of architecture, including his photograph of a Latticed window in Lacock Abbey taken in 1835.

In 1851 the French Commission des Monuments Historiques commissioned the Mission héliographique, sending five photographers, Édouard Baldus, Hippolyte Bayard, Gustave Le Gray, Henri Le Secq and Auguste Mestral, to record historic buildings so that it could judge their need for preservation and restoration. They delivered 258 photographs, which the commission never published.

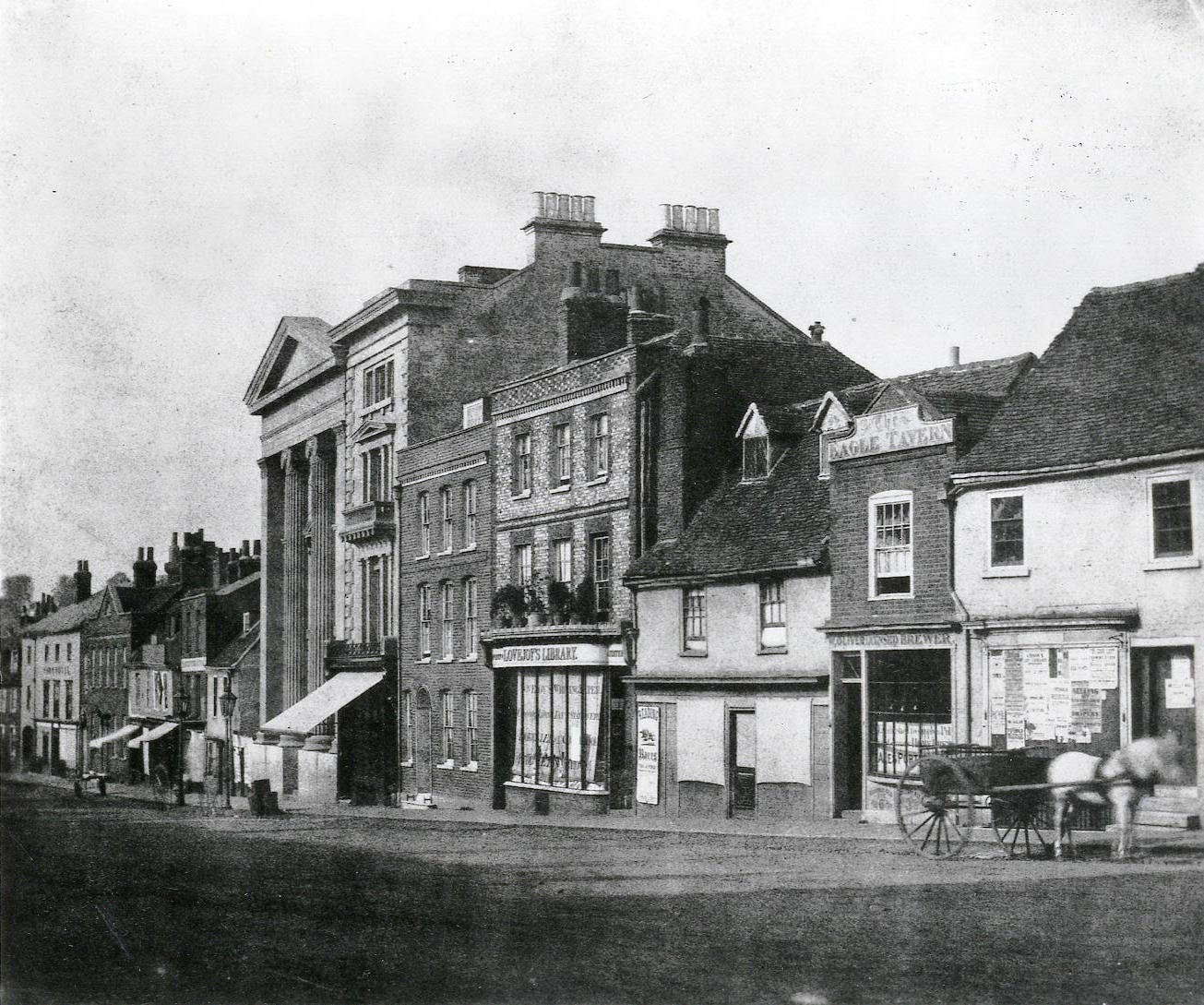
Early architectural style photograph by William Henry Fox Talbot, c. 1845

Much as building designs changed and morphed with traditional forms, architectural photography also evolved with time. During the early-to-mid-20th century, architectural photography became more creative as photographers used diagonal lines and bold shadows in their compositions, and experimented with other innovative techniques. Julius Shulman spent some seventy years documenting modern architecture in and around Los Angeles, photographing most of the houses of the Case Study House program, among them Pierre Koenig's Case Study House #22 (1960); his working archive holds about 260,000 prints, negatives and color transparencies.

By the early 1950s, architects were hiring more photographers for commissioned work, resulting in architectural photography being viewed as more of an art form than what it had been considered before. A tenet of architectural photography is the use of perspective control, with an emphasis on vertical lines that are non-converging (parallel). This is achieved by positioning the focal plane of the camera so that it is perpendicular to the ground, regardless of the height of the camera. This result can be achieved by the use of view cameras, tilt/shift lenses, or post-processing.

== Techniques ==
Traditionally, view cameras have been used for architectural photography as they allow for the lens to be tilted or shifted relative to the film plane. This allows for control of perspective, as well as a variety of creative possibilities.

In a similar fashion to landscape photography, a deep depth of field is usually employed so that both the foreground and background (to infinity) are in sharp focus.

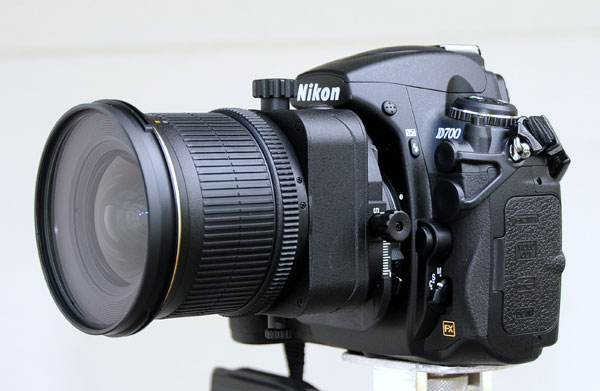
Nikon 24mm perspective control lens

More recently, digital single lens reflex (DSLR) cameras have been used in the field of architectural photography. These cameras also employ detachable, tilt-shift lenses of varying (usually fixed) focal lengths.

Wide-angle lenses are commonly used for both interior and exterior photographs.

== Real estate ==
Real estate photography is a subgenre of architectural photography, but different in a number of ways. While both real estate photography and architectural photography are the practice of capturing interior and exterior photographs, the way in which the images are captured and used can vary greatly. At its core, real estate photography is used for marketing and sales, as opposed to architectural photography, which is more artistic and expressive in nature.

Even though many times the subject matter is the same, the approach used by a photographer can be different depending on if the photoshoot is considered a real estate or architectural shoot. A photographer may actually even bring completely different gear dependent on which type of shoot they have scheduled. Both the photographer and the client will have different expectations depending on the real estate vs. architectural photography distinction.

== Construction photography ==
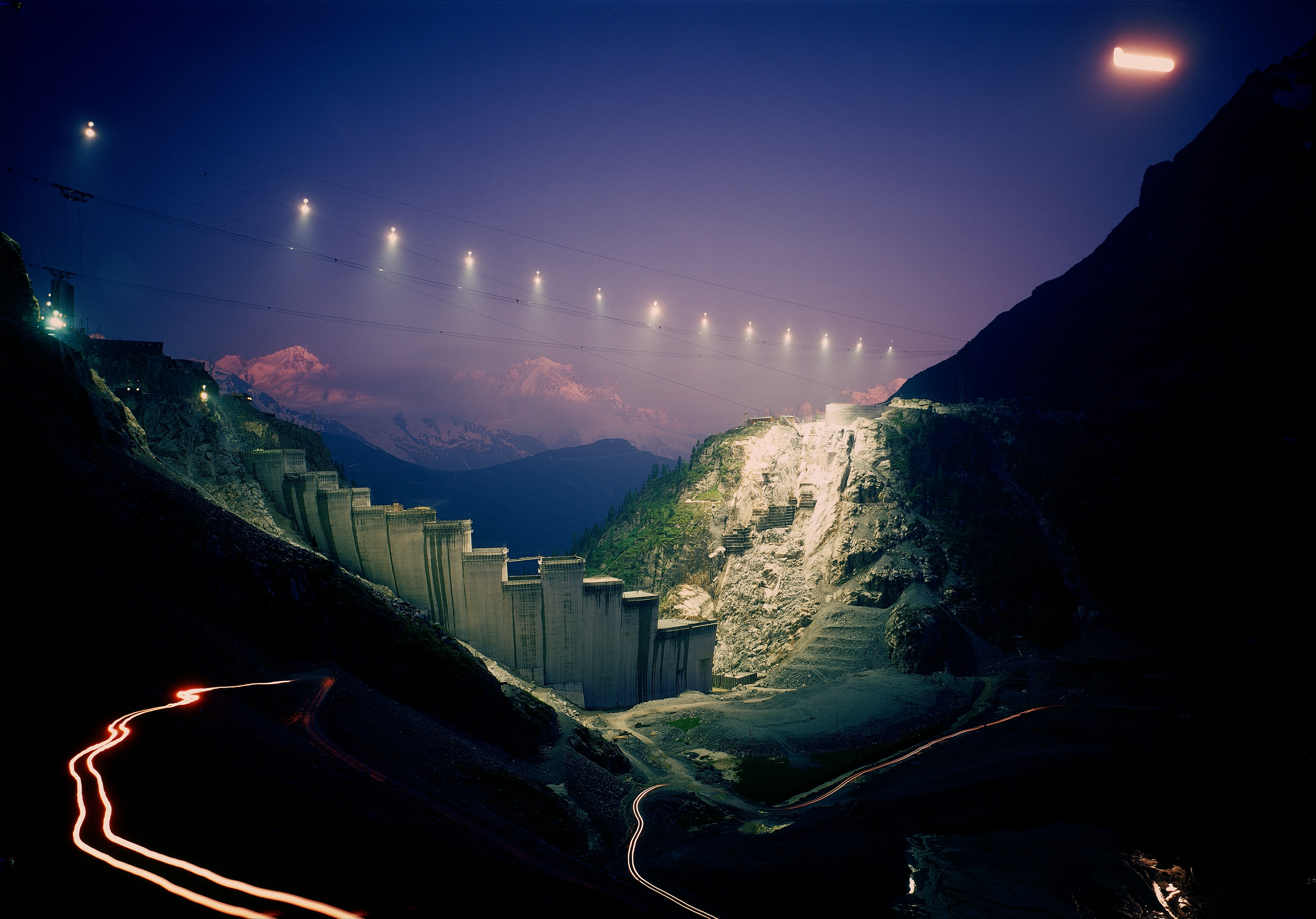
Construction of the Lac d'Émosson, 1971

Construction photography is a genre of photography that captures images related to the construction industry. This includes photographs of construction sites, buildings under construction, architectural structures, as well as the workers and machinery involved in the construction process.

The origins of construction photography can be traced back to the mid-19th century with the rise of architectural photography. As photographic processes advanced, photographers began documenting major construction projects and engineering feats, such as bridges, railroads, and urban development. This allowed project stakeholders to monitor progress and gave the public visual access to large-scale infrastructure taking shape. Over time, construction photography evolved from simple documentation to a specialized craft. Pioneers like Eadweard Muybridge used sequential photos of building processes. Newspapers hired staff photographers to cover major projects. Technological advances like higher quality cameras, artificial lighting, and remote photography enabled more versatile and artistic approaches. Construction photography gained wider appeal with public infrastructure projects during the New Deal era.

== Exterior and interior ==
Architectural photography typically shows either the exterior or the interior of buildings. The techniques used in each of these types of photography are similar, but do have some difference and sometimes require different equipment depending upon the requirements.

=== Exterior ===
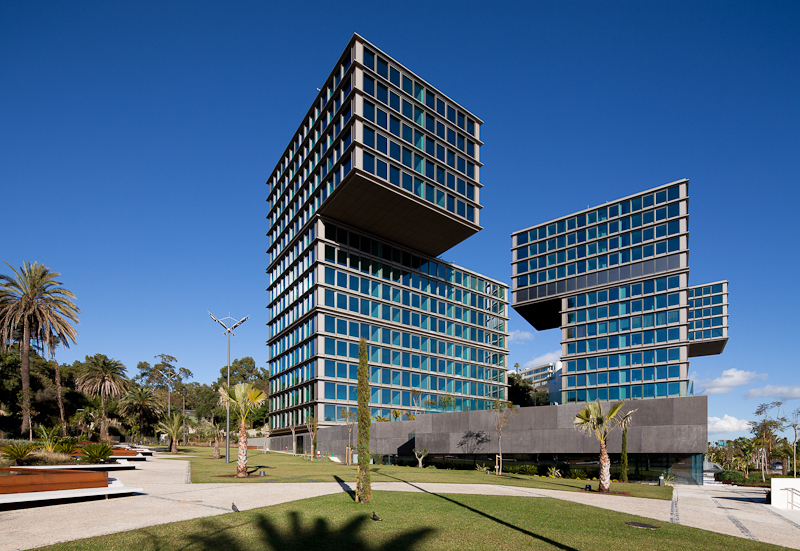
Example of an exterior architectural photograph

Exterior architectural photography usually takes advantage of available light by day, or at night it uses ambient light from adjacent street lights, landscape lights, exterior building lights, moonlight and even twilight present in the sky in all but the darkest situations.

In many cases, the landscaping surrounding a building is important to the overall composition of a photograph, and even necessary to communicate the aesthetic harmony of a building with its environment. The photographer will often include flowers, trees, fountains or statues in the foreground of a composition, taking advantage of their ability to help lead the eye into the composition and to its main subject, the building.

Aerial photography is trending as it shows different and unique perspectives of the structure being photographed. This can include getting level with the structure, showing property boundaries, revealing the location in a geographical view point, and putting context to surrounding scenery.

=== Interior ===
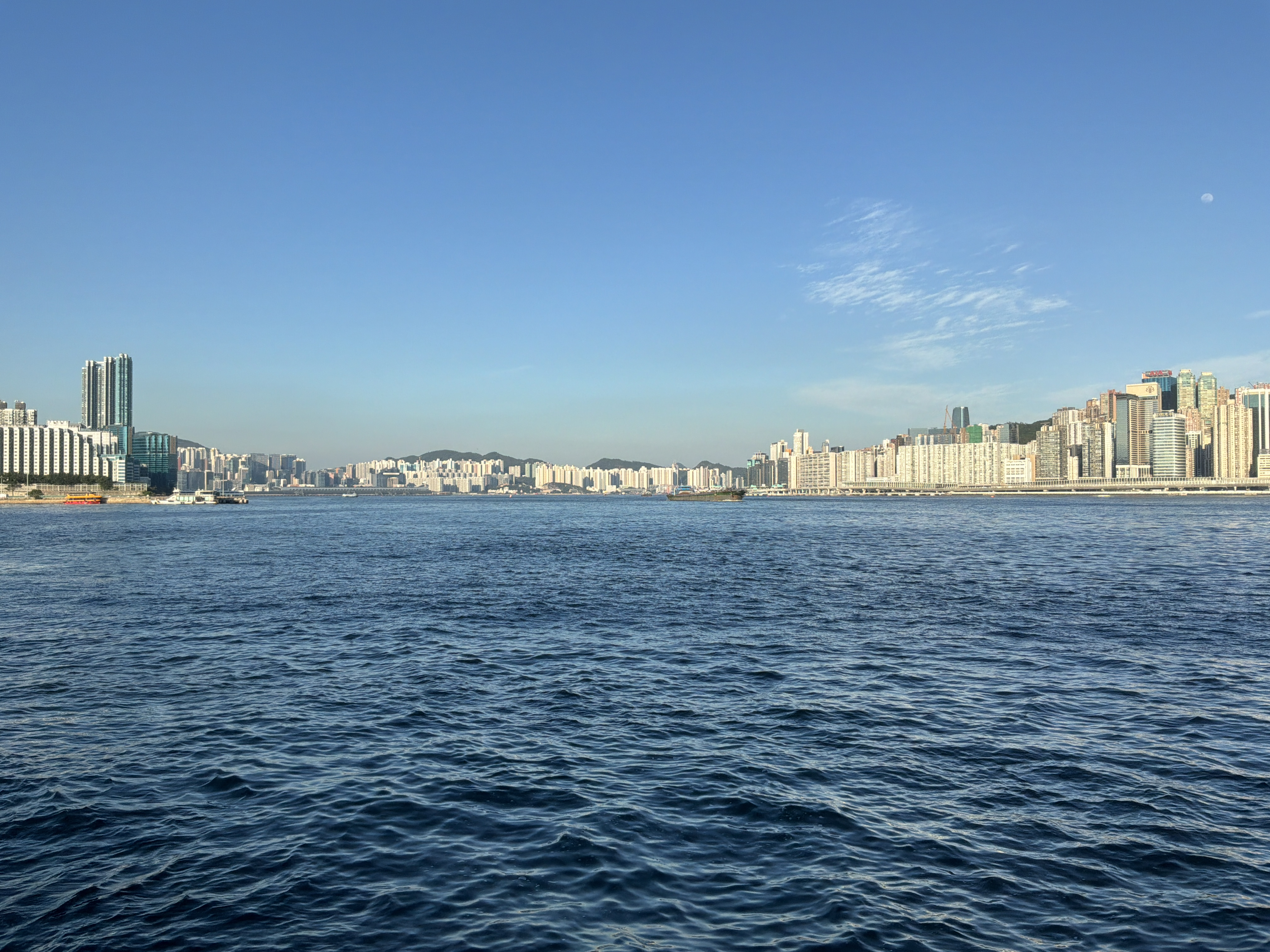
Harbour View Room Rosewood Hong Kong

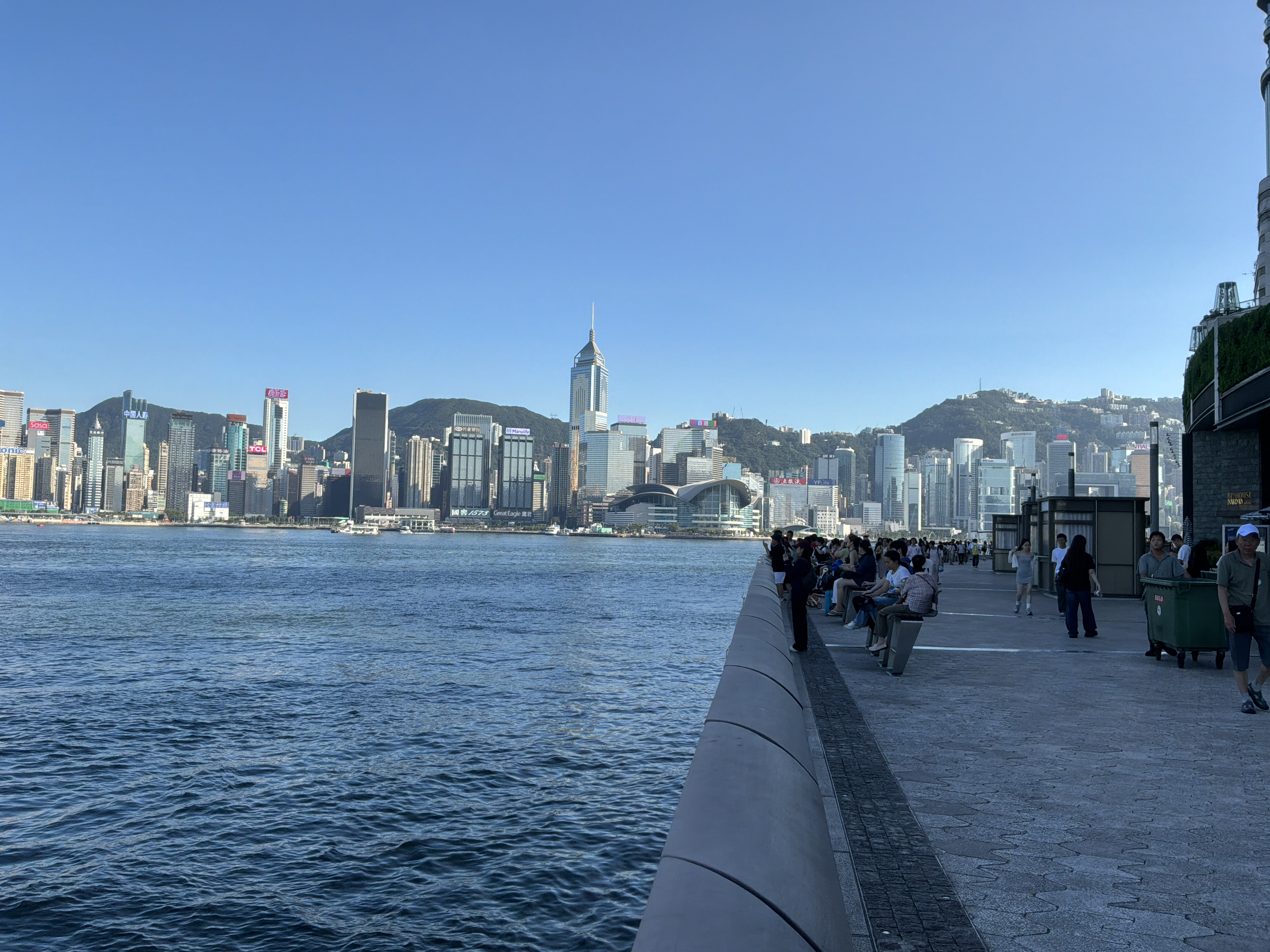
Grand Harbour View Room Rosewood Hong Kong

Interior architectural photography can also be performed with ambient light transmitted through windows and skylights, as well as interior lighting fixtures. Frequently though, architectural photographers use supplemental lighting to improve the illumination within a building. Either electronic flash "strobes" or incandescent "hot lights" are generally used. A feature of architectural photography is that the principal subjects almost always remain stationary. It is therefore possible to use post-processing editing to achieve a balanced lighting scheme, even in the absence of additional lighting.

This combination of using natural light and artificial light is sometimes described as "flambient lighting" - a combination of the words "flash" and "ambient". The key is not letting one of the light sources over power the other. If used properly and blended well in post-processing, the result is the best lighting possible for interior photography.

=== Detail ===
The architectural detail of a building shows a closer view of the texture and material from which they are built. This type of closer framing provides additional information on the materiality, usability and finishes of the building or property.

== See also ==
- Architectural photographers
- Perspective control lens
- Perspective control
- View camera
