= A Theory of Justice: The Musical =

2013 musical comedy by Eylon Levy

- Music: Ramin Sabi; Toby Huelin; Eylon Levy; Tommy Peto
- Lyrics: Eylon Levy; Ramin Sabi; Tommy Peto
- Book: Eylon Levy; Ramin Sabi; Tommy Peto
- Basis: A Theory of Justice by John Rawls
- Productions: 2013 Oxford; 2013 Edinburgh; 2015 Cardiff (Amateur); 2018 London (Workshop)

A Theory of Justice: The Musical is a musical comedy by Eylon Levy, Ramin Sabi, Tommy Peto and Toby Huelin. Billed as a "time-travelling romp through 2,500 years of political philosophy", the musical tells a fictionalised account of the writing of A Theory of Justice (1971), the classic philosophical treatise by the American political philosopher John Rawls.

The musical premiered in Oxford's Keble O'Reilly Theatre in January 2013 and was revived for the Edinburgh Fringe Festival in August 2013, where it was nominated for four awards in the categories of Best Musical, Best Book, Best Music, and Best Lyrics. In 2018, a reworked version was presented for a rehearsed reading in London's West End. The official cast soundtrack was released in May 2019.

The musical follows John Rawls on a journey through time to gain inspiration for A Theory of Justice from a chorus of singing and dancing political philosophers, including Plato, Locke, Hobbes, Rousseau, Mill, Wollstonecraft, Marx and Kant. As he pursues his love interest, a beautiful student named Fairness, Rawls is menaced by villainous libertarian philosopher Robert Nozick and his lover Ayn Rand, who plot to stop Rawls writing his redistributionist theory of justice.

The real-life John Rawls' daughter Liz praised the musical as "perfect" and "amazing and witty" after watching the Edinburgh Fringe Festival production, saying it "far surpassed any expectations".

== Synopsis ==
=== Act I ===
Behind the veil of ignorance, Immanuel Kant promises to tell the audience a 2,000-year-long musical story about justice ("Overture"). In Harvard University in 1971, students are excited to change the world but think philosophy is pointless ("Harvard Yard!"). John Rawls, starting his first day as a young Harvard philosophy professor, realises he needs his big idea to inspire them ("I Need a Theory"). He quickly falls in love with a beautiful student who gives him a clue, and he calls her Fairness ("Justice as Fairness"). Meanwhile, Rawls' boss, the sinister Robert Nozick, decides to write his own theory ("Nozick Needs a Theory")—a libertarian philosophy to shrink the role of the state, which Rawls fears will hurt the poor ("No, No, No, Nozick"). By a stroke of luck, the physicists accidentally open a time vortex in Harvard Yard ("It's a Vortex") and Fairness falls down it. Rawls jumps down the vortex to save his muse and meet the classical philosophers for inspiration ("I'll Have a Theory!").

Robert Nozick returns home to his lover, the villainous Ayn Rand. They realise Rawls is trying to write a liberal egalitarian theory that would promote wealth redistribution, and Nozick resolves to pursue Rawls to stop him.

Fairness arrives in Ancient Greece, where the eccentric philosopher Zeno offers to take her to a wise man who can help her get home, and they walk there in ever smaller steps. Rawls wakes up and is led to the Piraeus, an ancient Athenian gay bar, to watch the ventriloquist artist Plato and his dummy Socrates ("Philosophy on a Plato").

Rawls tries in vain to impress Fairness by criticising the Republic ("What Plato Is Ignoring" / "What I Love About His Theory"), and she leaves. Fairness sings about her frustrations being unable to find a man who loves her for her ideas ("My Philosopher-King").

In Civil War-era England, Thomas Hobbes and John Locke compete for control through a rap battle ("The State of Nature"), which Rawls attempts to mediate ("Rebuke of Hobbes and Locke"). Fairness is abducted by the gangs, but Rawls saves her by outsmarting them ("The Fairest Girl"). Fairness rebuffs his advances again and leaves. She realises that Rawls might be the man she is looking for ("My Philosopher-King (reprise)") and agrees to give him a chance.

In an 18th-century Swiss town square, Rawls and Fairness rescue louche lothario Jean-Jacques Rousseau from his chains, and Rousseau immediately seduces Fairness ("Man Was Born Free"). Nozick appears to foil Rawls' efforts, and Fairness elopes with Rousseau when Rawls fails to refute him.

Nozick is determined to write his own theory to upstage Rawls ("Nozick: When I Write My Theory"), but Ayn Rand is frustrated by his slow progress. She threatens that her love for him is conditional on his defeating Rawls, leading a sexy tango number that culminates in a rousing Act I Finale ("You Must Be Selfish") with the ensemble.

=== Act II ===
Nozick finally comes up with his own libertarian theory that argues against government wealth redistribution ("Nozick's Theory of Justice"), aided by two dancing showgirls, Transfer and Acquisition. Fairness laments that Rousseau cheated on her ("My Philosopher King (reprise 2)") and is comforted by the feminist writer Mary Wollstonecraft. On a Victorian promenade, a miserable Rawls stumbles upon the Utilitarian Barbershop Quartet, a travelling troupe who sing to make people happy. Fairness offers to help Rawls write his theory but is incensed by his refusal to take her ideas seriously ("Woman Was Not Born Free"). She calls on her new feminist friends to tell him about the importance of female voices and women's rights in a jazzy number led by Mary Wollstonecraft, backed by suffragette Emmeline Pankhurst and suffragist Millicent Fawcett ("Break Out Your Gilded Cage"). Fairness runs away again.

At an abandoned railway station in a dystopian America, Ayn Rand reveals she has been travelling through history seducing different philosophers (including Martin Luther, Alexander Hamilton, and Adam Smith) to advance or destroy their careers in a powerful showstopper ("The Leading Lady").

A downhearted Rawls ("I'd Be a Great Thinker") encounters Karl Marx, a crazy homeless man, who depresses him further. He considers giving up, but instead decides writing his theory means going back to square one in the show's 11 o'clock number ("Forget It All"). Rawls' fabulous "deontological fairy Gottmutter" Immanuel Kant arrives to urge him not to give up and give him clues to complete his theory ("You're a Rational Being").

Inspired by Kant, Rawls devises the Veil of Ignorance ("The Veil of Ignorance"). He finds Fairness trapped behind the Veil, but she refuses to leave until he explains what justice is. Nozick threatens to shoot Rawls but allows him to present his ideas ("The Principles of Justice"). Rand arrives to finish Rawls off with the other philosophers in tow, having persuaded them that Rawls opposes their ideas. Rawls convinces the philosophers that he synthesised the best of their works ("Historical Synthesis"). The philosophers are tricked into falling behind the Veil of Ignorance and converge on Rawls' principles of justice, vindicating his theory ("The Formal Principles of Justice").

Fairness pushes Rand behind the Veil, and she disappears, because having forgotten her own interests, "there was nothing left of her". Nozick storms off, promising to return in three years with his own theory. Fairness and Rawls finally kiss ("We Have a Theory").

== Musical numbers ==
The official cast soundtrack was released on iTunes and Spotify in 2019.

Act I

- Overture — Immanuel Kant, Chorus
- "Harvard Yard!" — John Rawls, Fairness, Harvard Students
- "I Need a Theory" — John Rawls
- "Justice as Fairness" — John Rawls
- "Nozick Needs a Theory/No, No, No, Nozick" — Robert Nozick, John Rawls
- "I'll Have a Theory" — John Rawls, Harvard Students
- "Philosophy on a Plato" — Plato, Socrates, Greek Chorus
- "What Plato is Ignoring"‡ — John Rawls
- "What I Love About His Theory"‡ — John Rawls
- "My Philosopher-King" — Fairness
- "The State of Nature" — Thomas Hobbes, John Locke, Civil War Gangs
- "Rebuke of Locke and Hobbes" — John Rawls
- "The Fairest Girl" — John Rawls, Fairness
- "My Philosopher-King (reprise)" — Fairness
- "Man Was Born Free" — Jean-Jacques Rousseau, Fairness
- "Nozick: When I Write My Theory"‡ — Robert Nozick
- "A Selfish Kind of Love/Act I Finale" — Ayn Rand, Robert Nozick, John Rawls, Fairness, Ensemble

Act II

- "Nozick's Theory" — Robert Nozick, Dancing Showgirls (Transfer and Acquisition)
- "My Philosopher-King (reprise 2)"‡ — Fairness
- "The Total Happiness" — Utilitarian Barbershop Quartet of J. S. Mill, Henry Sidgwick, Jeremy Bentham, James Mill
- "Woman Was Not Born Free" — Fairness
- "Break Out Your Gilded Cage" — Mary Wollstonecraft, Emmeline Pankhurst, Millicent Fawcett, Fairness
- "The Leading Lady" — Ayn Rand, Robert Nozick
- "I'd Be a Great Thinker" — John Rawls
- "Forget It All" — John Rawls
- "You're a Rational Being" — Immanuel Kant, Rawls
- "The Veil of Ignorance" — John Rawls
- "The Principles of Justice" — John Rawls
- "Historical Synthesis" — John Rawls
- "The Formal Principles of Justice" — Philosophers
- "We Have a Theory" — John Rawls, Fairness, Ensemble

‡ Does not appear in 2018 London soundtrack

The musical score was written for a six-piece band, including reeds, the keyboard, percussion, guitar, and bass.

== Characters ==
=== Leads ===
- John Rawls, a young Harvard philosophy professor and liberal hero
- Fairness, a beautiful Harvard student and Rawls' muse
- Robert Nozick, the libertarian villain and Harvard professor
- Ayn Rand, an evil Objectivist philosopher and Nozick's lover

=== Main philosophers ===
- Plato, an Ancient Greek ventriloquist artist
- Socrates, Plato's doll
- Thomas Hobbes, a brutish English civil-warlord
- John Locke, a more civil English civil-warlord
- Jean-Jacques Rousseau, a dashing revolutionary
- John Stuart Mill, the Utilitarian Barbershop Quartet lead
- Mary Wollstonecraft, a feminist extraordinaire
- Karl Marx, a crazy homeless man
- Immanuel Kant, a deontological fairy godmother

=== Supporting cast ===
- Harvard University students: Brian, Jeremy, Stuart, Jack, Carla, Joan, Mary
- Zeno, an eccentric Greek philosopher
- Greek Chorus: Glaucon, Adeimantus, Thrasymachus, Aristotle
- Lockean henchmen: Algernon Sidney, James Tyrrell
- Hobbesian henchmen: Robert Filmer, Jean Bodin
- Geneva Gaoler
- Nozick's dancing showgirls, Transfer and Acquisition
- Utilitarian Barbershop Quartet: Jeremy Bentham (bass), James Mill (baritone), Henry Sidgwick (tenor)
- Feminists: Emmeline Pankhurst, Millicent Fawcett
- Heavenly Chorus (voices behind the veil of ignorance)

The musical can be performed by a minimum cast of 11 actors (6 male, 5 female).

== Production history ==
Original 2013 Oxford production poster. By the time the posters were printed, one night was already sold out.

The book, lyrics and music were written by Eylon Levy, multi-Olivier and Tony Award winning producer Ramin Sabi, and Tommy Peto – undergraduate students of Philosophy, Politics and Economics at the University of Oxford. Additional music, orchestrations, and arrangements were composed by Toby Huelin, an Oxford music student.

The writers confirmed in an interview that the musical "did in fact start out as a joke, but then it snowballed into a full-scale production". They wrote the musical "because it sounded like too funny a concept to pass up on", and after playing around with some tunes on the piano and brainstorming jokes, they "realised that this had the potential to be an exciting, bold and really funny new musical".

The writers described A Theory of Justice: The Musical! as a "light-hearted, tongue-in-cheek, camp and intellectually profound addition to the musical theatre canon", as well as "irreverent and self-deprecating". They said that it was "very much based on traditional Broadway, Disney-style musicals" and satirising that genre of musical. Co-writer Eylon Levy has revealed that the music "very often sprang out of the philosophy itself", and that the writers used the rhythm of lines of philosophical texts, such as Rousseau's The Social Contract, for inspiration.

=== 2013 original Oxford production ===
A Theory of Justice: The Musical! enjoyed a sell-out world premiere in Oxford's 180-seater Keble O'Reilly Theatre, 30 January – 2 February 2013, and according to producers broke box office records for Oxford student theatre. It was produced by writers Sabi and Levy for DEM Productions, directed by Esmé Hicks and choreographed by Dana Mills, with musical direction by composer Toby Huelin. To create the time vortex, the production used the "biggest lighting budget ever" for a show at the O'Reilly Theatre.

The musical received rave reviews. Philosopher Nigel Warburton called it "brilliant: hilarious, witty, and profound", saying he "cried with laughter for most of two hours". The Cherwell gave the musical five stars, calling it "spectacularly, delightfully nerdy... both entertaining and educational, a truly remarkable musical. You would be a fool to miss it." Reviews in the Oxford Theatre Review called the musical "utterly brilliant" and "supremely funny, deftly pressing complicated philosophical jargon... into service as comedic fodder". Philosophy Now wrote: "A Theory of Justice melds exuberant song and comedic gold with legitimate intellectual heft, resulting in a work that is at once eminently highbrow and infectiously funny". The Philosophers' Magazine wrote: "[It] had me laughing until the tears streamed down my face and my cheeks were aching... Utterly hilarious!". One blogger described the musical as "the best thing to come out of an Oxford University PPE degree since the PPE in PPE twitter feed".

Reviewers also praised the musical's educational value, and a review in Philosophy Magazine said: "All of these scenes are so cleverly and originally interpreted that, as well as being utterly hilarious, they have real pedagogical value... To create something that has both philosophical accuracy and genuine comedy is no mean feat, and yet [the writers] have somehow managed to write a script that has both, by the bucket load."

=== 2013 Edinburgh Fringe Festival revival ===
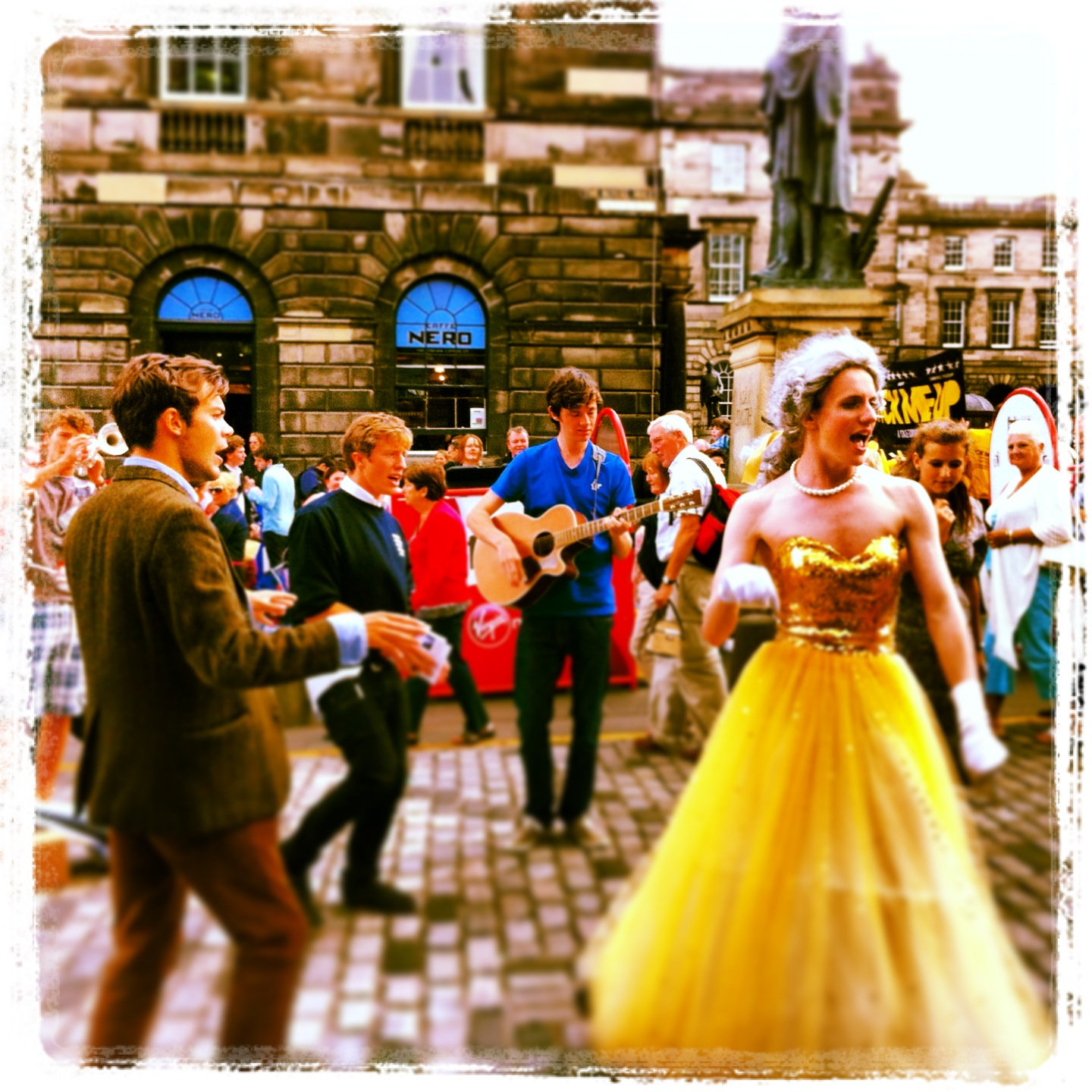
The cast of A Theory of Justice promoting the musical in Edinburgh during the Fringe Festival

A Theory of Justice: The Musical! was revived for the Edinburgh Fringe Festival, running from 31 July to 26 August 2013 at C Venues. The revival was produced by DEM Productions using the same cast and crew, with minor changes. The Edinburgh revival included a new song: "My Philosopher-King", a solo love ballad for Fairness.

The musical was nominated for Best Musical, Best Book, Best Lyrics and Best Music at the Musical Theatre Network Awards.

FringeGuru.com described A Theory of Justice: The Musical! as "bizarre, brave, deranged, intelligent, creative and ever-so-slightly magnificent". Reviewer Chris Grady wrote, "I sat watching A Theory of Justice desperately trying to remember who wrote it... Only on leaving... did I realise this is a wholly new, original work." EdFringeReview.com described the musical as "probably the most unashamedly intellectual musical ever written... It is best not to take this show too seriously since thankfully it doesn't seem to take itself seriously either... entertaining and thoroughly original". A review on BroadwayBaby.com called it "a humorous and enlightening musical... ambitious and brave". A reviewer for The Flaneur wrote: "This is what the Edinburgh fringe should be like... philosophy with a smile on its face, doing the conga through history."

=== 2018 London West End workshop ===
In February 2018, the musical was workshopped by award-winning director Josh Seymour with a cast of West End actors, including Matthew Seadon-Young as John Rawls and Alex Young as Ayn Rand. It was staged for two performances at the 350-seat Arts Theatre in London's West End on 19 February 2018. The reworked version included several new songs, including a grand Act I finale and medley, a new villain's song for Ayn Rand ("The Leading Lady"), and a power ballad for John Rawls ("Forget It All").

=== Amateur productions ===
Cardiff 2015

A Theory of Justice: The Musical! received its Welsh premiere at Cardiff University in Spring 2015. The Cardiffian called the musical "an absurd, exorbitant and playful show" that "explains opaque political philosophy in cheeky dialogues, cheerful songs and sexy acting", describing the script as "hilarious".

== Awards and nominations ==
=== 2013 Edinburgh Fringe Festival revival ===
Year	Award Ceremony	Category	Nominee	Result
2013	WhatsOnStage/Musical Theatre Network Award	Best Musical	Eylon Levy, Ramin Sabi, Tommy Peto, Toby Huelin	Nominated
2013	WhatsOnStage/Musical Theatre Network Award	Best Book	Eylon Levy, Ramin Sabi and Tommy Peto	Nominated
2013	WhatsOnStage/Musical Theatre Network Award	Best Music	Ramin Sabi, Toby Huelin, Eylon Levy and Tommy Peto	Nominated
2013	WhatsOnStage/Musical Theatre Network Award	Best Lyrics	Eylon Levy, Ramin Sabi and Tommy Peto	Nominated
