= Libertarian perspectives on affirmative action =

Political ideology

Libertarian perspectives on affirmative action consistently coincide with the way that libertarians view the state as a coercive power. Many libertarians believe that the state should not be used as an instrument of power in enforcing what they call positive discrimination.

== Overview ==
One point of view considers libertarianism as being compatible with affirmative action. Associate professor of political science Andrew Valls from Oregon State University writes in a paper titled "The Libertarian Case for Affirmative Action" that "libertarianism underwrites don't call for black reparations, and that affirmative action policies can be seen as a partial payment on reparations that are owed African Americans", in what Valls references as "the principle of justice in rectification", a term originally created by Robert Nozick in his book, Anarchy, State, and Utopia. This view contradicts the mainstream view of many libertarian think tanks.

A point of view that coincides with mainstream views that many libertarians share is "the use of racial classifications in public policies, including in affirmative action policy, pose[s] a great threat to individual liberties." Many libertarians claim that restrictions placed on private sectors violate certain individual rights and liberties. Libertarians often oppose intervention, especially by governments, of any kind in the private sector.

David Bernstein, a Foundation Professor at George Mason University, argues that anti-discrimination law should at the very least be scrutinized, a main reason being that "...Antidiscrimination laws are unlikely to provide much protection to a minority group when the majority of the voting population is hostile to that group." Furthermore, according to Bernstein, even with anti-discrimination laws in place, the majority population is no more inclined to change previously held perceptions of the minority population, eliciting little to no change.

Another main reason why libertarians tend to oppose affirmative action is due to the macroeconomics issues the policy presents. Llewellyn Rockwell, a libertarian author and editor, references Steven Yates' book, "Civil Wrongs: What Went Wrong With Affirmative Action" as an example as to why affirmative action is a policy that libertarians tend to not support. Additionally, Rockwell argues that anti-discrimination laws such as affirmative action is "an inefficient use of labor and intellectual resources." Rockwell reasons that individuals should be hired or accepted to a university based on merit rather than having to be subjected to affirmative action laws. Because affirmative action laws tend to require a certain quota of majority versus minority individuals being hired or accepted, Rockwell argues that it is possible for an individual belonging to a majority would be rejected in favor of another individual belonging to a minority.

Marie Gryphon argues that affirmative action can cause more harm to minority groups than good. "A phenomenon called the "ratchet effect" means that preferences at a handful of top schools, including state flagship institutions, can worsen racial disparities in academic preparation at all other American colleges and universities, including those that do not use admissions preferences." Due to this "ratchet effect", Gryphon argues that the disparity between the majority and minority populations are only worsened due to affirmative action policies. Often, advocates of affirmative action argue that "college has helped many minority students achieve middle-class lives" and that "without preferences colleges would become "re-segregated," depriving American students of the educational benefits of a diverse student body." Gryphon also argues that preferences, especially racial, harms "students of all races by impeding learning and generating unnecessary suspicion and distrust between groups."
