= The Examined Life =

1989 book by Robert Nozick

- Cover of the first edition
- Author: Robert Nozick
- Language: English
- Subject: Philosophy
- Publisher: Simon & Schuster
- Publication date: 1989
- Publication place: United States
- Media type: Print (Hardcover and Paperback)
- Pages: 308
- ISBN: 0-671-72501-7

The Examined Life is a 1989 collection of philosophical meditations by the philosopher Robert Nozick. The book drew a number of critical reactions. The work is drawn partially as a response to Socrates' assertion in Plato's "The Apology of Socrates" that the unexamined life is one not worth living.

== Overview and structure ==
The book consists of twenty-seven philosophical meditations, beginning with the chapter "Dying" and concluding with "A Portrait of the Philosopher as a Young Man." Nozick addresses fundamental questions about living and what is important in life, covering topics including death, creativity, sexuality, happiness, parents and children, romantic love, emotions, the nature of God, religious faith, the Holocaust, enlightenment, and wisdom.

=== Philosophical approach ===
Rather than employing the argumentative mode of his earlier work Anarchy, State, and Utopia or the purely explanatory mode of Philosophical Explanations, Nozick adopts a meditative approach in The Examined Life. He poses questions that often remain intentionally unanswered to encourage readers to examine their own lives. The book aims to bring philosophy back to questions of everyday human existence, addressing topics that had become increasingly removed from life in academic philosophy.

== Content and themes ==
=== The nature of reality ===
The book's central unifying question explores the nature of "reality," which Nozick describes as distinct from mere existence. He develops a scalar notion of degrees of reality, different from the binary concept of existence versus non-existence. Nozick uses examples of literary and historical figures to illustrate this concept—suggesting that some are "more real" than others, such as Hamlet, Socrates, Buddha, Gandhi, and Jesus.

Nozick constructs an elaborate "matrix of reality" containing multiple dimensions including value, meaning, importance, weight, depth, amplitude, intensity, and vividness. These dimensions can be organized into various geometric configurations, and readers are encouraged to contemplate and construct their own matrices of reality. The construction of this multi-dimensional framework represents Nozick's attempt to provide a systematic account of what makes lives and experiences more or less "real."

=== The Experience Machine ===
The book includes a refined version of Nozick's famous experience machine thought experiment, originally introduced in Anarchy, State, and Utopia (1974). In this version, Nozick asks readers to imagine a machine that could provide any experience they desire for the rest of their lives. The thought experiment explores whether people would choose a life of simulated pleasure over authentic reality, challenging hedonism and theory of mind

=== Political philosophy ===
According to reviewers such as Thomas Kelly, Nozick used The Examined Life as well as another work to "explicitly [disown]" the earlier radical libertarian concepts he presented in Anarchy, State, and Utopia. Nozick's political views in this work are notably less radical than in his earlier libertarian writings, with some reviewers noting he no longer espouses anarcho-capitalism.

=== Other key topics ===
The book addresses numerous other philosophical and existential questions:

- Death and dying: The opening chapter explores mortality and our relationship with death
- Creativity: Examines the nature of creative work and its role in reshaping the self
- Love and sexuality: Explores romantic bonds, emotions, and the metaphysical dimensions of sexuality
- Religious faith: Contemplates the nature of God and religious experience
- The Holocaust: Addresses questions of evil and suffering
- Eastern philosophy: Engages with Zen concepts of enlightenment and Asian contemplative traditions
- Wisdom: Questions what constitutes wisdom and why philosophers seek it

=== Chapter list ===
The complete list of chapters is as follows:

1. Dying
2. Parents and Children
3. Creating
4. Nature of God, the Nature of Faith
5. Holiness of Everyday Life
6. Sexuality
7. Love's Bond
8. Emotions
9. Happiness
10. Focus
11. Being More Real
12. Selflessness
13. Stances
14. Value and Meaning
15. Importance and Weight
16. Matrix of Reality
17. Darkness and Light
18. Theological Explanations
19. Holocaust
20. Enlightenment
21. Giving Everything Its Due
22. What is Wisdom and Why Do Philosophers Love It So?
23. Ideal and the Actual
24. Zigzag of Politics
25. Philosophy's Life
26. Portrait of the Philosopher as a Young Man

== Style and methodology ==
The book engages with both Western philosophy and Asian philosophical and contemplative traditions. The work is characterized by Nozick's willingness to pose provocative questions while leaving many deliberately unanswered, functioning as what he describes as "an invitation to the examined life."

== Reception ==
Jim Holt, a columnist for The Literary Review, left critical remarks about what he termed the "semantic slum", deeming it "trickled down philosophy" and suggesting it was not worth reading.
