= Entitlement theory =

Robert Nozick's theory of distributive justice

Entitlement theory is a theory of distributive justice and private property created by Robert Nozick in chapters 7 and 8 of his book Anarchy, State, and Utopia. The theory is Nozick's attempt to describe "justice in holdings" (Nozick 1974:150)—or what can be said about and done with the property people own when viewed from a principle of justice.

== Principles ==
Nozick's entitlement theory comprises three main principles:

1. A principle of justice in acquisition – This principle deals with the initial acquisition of holdings. It is an account of how people first come to own unowned and natural world property, what types of things can be held, and so forth.
2. A principle of justice in transfer – This principle explains how one person can acquire holdings from another, including voluntary exchange and gifts.
3. A principle of rectification of injustice – how to deal with holdings that are unjustly acquired or transferred, whether and how much victims can be compensated, how to deal with long past transgressions or injustices done by a government, and so on.

Nozick believes that if the world were wholly just, only the first two principles would be needed, as "the following inductive definition would exhaustively cover the subject of justice in holdings":

1. A person who acquires a holding in accordance with the principle of justice in acquisition is entitled to that holding.
2. A person who acquires a holding in accordance with the principle of justice in transfer, from someone else entitled to the holding, is entitled to the holding.
3. No one is entitled to a holding except by (repeated) applications of 1 and 2. (Nozick 1974:151)

Thus, entitlement theory would imply "a distribution is just if everyone is entitled to the holdings they possess under the distribution" (Nozick 1974:151). However, not everyone follows these rules: "some people steal from others, or defraud them, or enslave them, seizing their product and preventing them from living as they choose, or forcibly exclude others from competing in exchanges" (Nozick 1974:152). Thus the third principle of rectification is needed.

Entitlement theory is based on John Locke's ideas. Under entitlement theory, people are represented as ends in themselves and equals, as Kant claimed, though different people may own (i.e. be entitled to) different amounts of property. Nozick's ideas create a strong system of private property and a free-market economy. The only just transaction is a voluntary one. Taxation of the rich to support full robust social programs for the poor is unjust because the state is acquiring money by force instead of through a voluntary transaction. However, Nozick's ideas can endorse the creation of a minimal social program for the poor. Every person in the state of nature can achieve a certain level of welfare according to their own abilities. This level of welfare, while not equal, must be maintained via the Lockean proviso. Given the justice of acquisition condition and the Lockean proviso, "It is conceivable that in the normal operation of the economy, a private property regime might at some times, for some people, fail to provide access to this level of welfare when left to itself. If so, then justice—as the libertarian understands it—demands that the state act to correct the distribution of welfare generated by the spontaneous play of market forces."

== Differences from other ideals ==
Entitlement theory contrasts sharply with the Principles of Justice in Rawls' A Theory of Justice, which states that each person has an equal claim to basic rights and liberties, and that inequality should only be permitted to the degree that such inequality is "reasonably expected to be to everyone's advantage" (Rawls 1999: 53). There is a further provision that such inequalities are only permissible insofar as there is an equality of opportunity to benefit from these inequalities. Nozick instead argues that people who have or produce certain things have rights over them: "on an entitlement view, [production and distribution] are not ... separate questions ... things come into the world already attached to people having entitlements over them" (Nozick 1974:160). Nozick believes that unjustly taking someone's holdings violates their rights. "Holdings to which ... people are entitled may not be seized, even to provide equality of opportunity for others" (Nozick 1974:235). Thus, a system which works to reduce the rightfully earned holdings of some so that they can be equally distributed to others is immoral.

"The major objection to speaking of everyone's having a right to various things such as equality of opportunity, life, and so on, and enforcing this right, is that these 'rights' require a substructure of things and materials and actions; and other people may have rights and entitlements over these. No one has a right to something whose realization requires certain uses of things and activities that other people have rights and entitlements over" (Nozick 1974:238).

== Criticism ==
In his later work The Examined Life, Nozick reflects that entitlement theory's defense of people's holdings may have some problems, in that it could eventually lead to the vast majority of resources being pooled in the hands of the extremely skilled, or, through gifts and inheritance, in the hands of the extremely skilled's friends and children. Nozick says:

"Bequeathing something to others is an expression of caring about them .. yet bequests [are] sometimes passed on for generations to persons unknown to the original earner, ... producing continuing inequalities of wealth and position. .. The resulting inequalities seem unfair.

One possible solution would be to restructure an institution of inheritance so that taxes will subtract from the possessions people can bequeath the value of what they themselves have received through bequests. People then could leave to others only the amount they themselves have added.

The simple subtraction rule does not perfectly disentangle what the next generation has managed itself to contribute—inheriting wealth may make it easier to amass more—but it is a serviceable rule of thumb" (Nozick 1989:30-31).

Furthermore, the notion of taxation being inherently unjust, and market transactions being inherently just, depends on the notion that they actually are as involuntary or voluntary as they appear: in a nation that permits free emigration of its citizens, taxation is not entirely involuntary, while market transactions for necessary goods and services can hardly be said to be entirely voluntary, and if the wealthy, or organized labor, or those in control of de facto industry standards are able to exert undue influence on such a market, they frequently skew those transactions to favor their own interests.

== See also ==
- Right to property
