= Socratic Puzzles =

1997 book by Robert Nozick

- Cover of the first edition
- Author: Robert Nozick
- Language: English
- Subject: Philosophy
- Publisher: Harvard University Press
- Publication date: 1997
- Publication place: United States
- Media type: Print (Hardcover and Paperback)
- Pages: 400
- ISBN: 0-674-81653-6

Socratic Puzzles is a 1997 collection of essays by the philosopher Robert Nozick.

== Summary ==
Nozick disclaims the title "political philosopher" and characterizes his Anarchy, State, and Utopia (1974) as "an accident" that came about because he was "getting nowhere" working on the problem of free will. He discusses his reverence for Socrates, and his intellectual debts to Sidney Morgenbesser and Carl Hempel. At "the most consequential party I ever attended," someone told him about a problem posed by a physicist in California, William Newcomb. Nozick brought this problem into the literature of decision theory ("rational choice theory"). He describes the influence of decision theory on Anarchy, State, and Utopia's derivation of the state from individuals' actions, and its game-theoretic analysis of utopia; and especially in The Nature of Rationality (1993), where he proposed a "decision value" alternative to maximizing expected utility and also extended decision theory to issues about rational belief.

He concludes the introduction by talking about philosophy as a way of life. Although "being philosophical" in the ordinary sense wasn't his motivation for entering philosophy, he found himself being philosophical when diagnosed with stomach cancer and informed about the dire statistics, adding parenthetically an anecdote about the operation in which much of his stomach was removed,

I maintain it was not a complaint when the first words I said to the surgeons upon coming up from anaesthesia after seven hours were, "I hope we don't have to do this again. I don't have the stomach for it."

Nietzsche's demand, that you should lead a life you would be willing to repeat infinitely often, seems "a bit stringent", but philosophy constitutes a way of life worth continuing to its end. Nozick did exactly that, according to his friend Alan Dershowitz.
