= Invariant =

Invariant and invariance may refer to:

== Computer science ==
- Invariant (computer science), an expression whose value doesn't change during program execution
  - Loop invariant, a property of a program loop that is true before (and after) each iteration
- A data type in method overriding that is neither covariant nor contravariant
- Class invariant, an invariant used to constrain objects of a class

== Physics, mathematics, and statistics ==
- Invariant (mathematics), a property of a mathematical object that is not changed by a specific operation or transformation
  - Rotational invariance, the property of function whose value does not change when arbitrary rotations are applied to its argument
  - Scale invariance, a property of objects or laws that do not change if scales of length, energy, or other variables, are multiplied by a common factor
  - Topological invariant
- Invariant (physics), something does not change under a transformation, such as from one reference frame to another
- Invariant estimator in statistics
- Measurement invariance, a statistical property of measurement
- Oxford University Invariant Society, an Oxford student mathematics club

== Other uses ==
- Invariant chain, a polypeptide which plays a critical role in antigen presentation
- Invariant (linguistics), a word that does not undergo inflection
- Invariant (music)
- Writer invariant, property of a text which is similar in all texts of a given author, and different in texts of different authors
- Invariance (magazine), a French Communist journal
- Invariances, a 2001 book by philosopher Robert Nozick
