= Arthur Allen Leff =

American legal scholar (1935–1981)

Arthur Allen Leff (1935–1981) was a professor of law at Yale Law School who is best known for a series of articles examining whether there is such a thing as a normative law or morality. Leff answered this question in the negative and followed the consequences to their logical conclusions. He graduated from Amherst College and Harvard Law School and also taught at the Washington University School of Law.

Leff's first major work, Economic Analysis of the Law: Some Realism About Nominalism, was putatively a book review of Richard Posner's Economic Analysis of the Law. In actuality it is a critique of the use of any single methodology to provide normative rules for law and morality. The article is still, today, a leading critique of Posner's work and economic analysis generally and is usually read in graduate seminars on Economic Analysis (though sometimes misidentified as a Legal Realist critique). Leff made two fundamental propositions in Some Realism About Nominalism: (1) that all models are only very limited views of the real world. When Posner views the world through the economic model much more is hidden than is revealed; (2) there is no system of logic for preferring one model (e.g. economic, social, political) over another unless an axiom is inserted early on into that system of logic. Leff noted that the opening of Posner's work does just that—inserts a proposition that rational economic behavior is to be preferred to other behavior. Leff further noted that, similarly, there is no way using logic to prove that any particular act, no matter how horrible, is normatively wrong. Put another way, one can never prove to another person that a particular set of behaviors is right or that a different set of behaviors is wrong. He stated:

I will put the current situation as sharply as possible: there is today no way of ‘proving’ that napalming babies is bad except by asserting it (in a louder and louder voice), or by defining it as so, early in one’s game, and then later slipping it through, in a whisper, as a conclusion.

Leff continued his critique of attempts to find normative rules in law and morality in Law and Technology: On shoring up a Void, Unspeakable Ethics, Unnatural Law (alluding to the title of a collection of stories by Donald Barthelme), and his review of Robert Unger's Knowledge and Politics in the form of a letter from The Devil. In these works, Leff attempted to directly address whether a normative morality can exist without God. Leff answered the question in the negative. Leff stated that absent an ultimate authority figure (i.e. God) handing down moral laws from on-high there is no reason for any person to prefer one set of behavior identified as "moral" to another. Leff termed this "the Grand Sez Who."

In Unspeakable Ethics, Unnatural Law Leff also criticized the views of Robert Nozick and Roberto Unger, noting that for all their differences they end up with remarkably similar solutions to the problem of resolving differences among morally sovereign individuals: agglomerations of the like-minded, geographically separated. Leff claimed that this move merely shifts the problem. Against Nozick, Leff states that his entire book, Anarchy, State, and Utopia, is built on the naked assertion that "individuals have rights", and that an entirely different yet equally valid argument could be built on the premise "individuals have duties".

Leff stated as follows in the closing of Unspeakable Ethics, Unnatural Law:

All I can say is this: it looks as if we are all we have. Given what we know about ourselves, and each other, this is an extraordinarily unappetizing prospect; looking around the world, it appears that if all men are brothers, the ruling model is Cain and Abel. Neither reason, nor love, nor even terror, seems to have worked to make us “good,” and worse than that, there is no reason why any thing should. Only if ethics were something unspeakable by us could law be unnatural, and therefore unchallengeable. As things stand now, everything is up for grabs. Nevertheless:

Napalming babies is bad.

Starving the poor is wicked.

Buying and selling each other is depraved.

Those who stood up and died resisting Adolf Hitler, Joseph Stalin, Idi Amin, and Pol Pot —and General Custer too— have earned salvation.

Those who acquiesced deserve to be damned.

There is in the world such a thing as evil.

[All together now:] Sez who?

God help us.

In Swindling and Selling, Leff presented a wry analysis of the blurry lines between what we consider honest salesmanship and illegal fraud. Not all selling is swindling, but all swindling is selling, Leff explains. He shows how both sellers and swindlers have to overcome similar forms of buyer resistance. Leff explains these dynamics in the language of Erving Goffman and through some use of behavioral economics.

In the case of swindling, con artists weave a dramaturgy where they hold a monopoly over some valuable asset, and the mark is set up as monopsonist, an exclusive buyer with access to a special deal. The scheme is premised on mutual need, and policing of these schemes is difficult because for part of the transaction, the mark is a willing participant. Here, Leff described scams such as the “Spanish Prisoner,” where a mark is promised great riches if he will only bribe some minor official to free the holder of the treasure (the modern version of this includes the “419” scheme). Leff then showed how the elements of swindling are present in some political and religious movements (although these may not be scams). The “ancient estate” scam, where marks are convinced that a fantastic old property was improperly distributed, making many modern-day people claimants to it, is similar to political movements to repatriate lands. “Godcons” are con games where the “conman…induces one or more marks to trade money…of this world value in exchange for the promised delivery of quantities of exceedingly valuable divinely manufactured goods.” Pyramid schemes operate by distracting marks from the opportunity costs of their labor, and by getting them emotionally attached to a swindle instead of more viable employment.

Leff then switched from “bunco” to legal selling. In a perfect market, bargains should not exist. Thus, sellers must create a plausible dramaturgy to explain why a buyer gets a bargain. This could be a clearance sale, with praises the buyer as parsimonious while implying that less careful consumers are getting the anti-bargain. Leff then turned to mass advertising, which relies upon several predicable cons: the “sufficiency switch” and the “Calvinist causation.” The former refers to the many products that suggest some cause and effect between the purchase of a product and some goal—clear up one’s complexion with a skin cream and succeed romantically. The latter is Leff’s term for positional objects: the Cadillac or the Mercedes. These things operate from an opposite logic. They do not make one successful, they license a script (and a prop) to the mark: “Buy this symbol with which you can advertise, powerfully and convincingly, that you are what you, and those about whose opinions you care, devoutly wish to be."

Leff was an agnostic but his writings have been influential on Christian discussions of morality in the modern era. Phillip E. Johnson has suggested that Leff's work is really a critique of the God is dead argument. Johnson argues that the presence of evil in the world is evidence that there is an absolute morality which requires an absolute authority. Other Christian scholars have also applied Leff's critique to secular arguments for a normative morality.

== Responses to Leff ==
Posner has responded to Leff by stating that the purpose of any methodology or model is to simplify. Otherwise it would be impossible to achieve any kind of understanding of the real world.

In Grounding Normative Assertions: Arthur Leff’s Still Irrefutable, but Incomplete, Sez Who Critique, 20 J. L. & Religion 31 (2004-2005), Washington and Lee University Law Professor Sam Calhoun agrees with Leff that attempts to ground secular, universal norms are doomed to fail. Calhoun argues, though, that Leff’s critique of moral norms is incomplete because Leff ignores a God-based morality. If God is introduced, normative assumptions can be securely grounded, although Calhoun acknowledges that looking to God for moral truth has many challenges.

== Major articles ==
- Unconscionability and the Code-The Emperor's New Clause, 115 U. Pa. L. Rev. 485 (1967)
- Economic Analysis of Law: Some Realism About Nominalism, 60 Va. L. Rev. 451 (1974).
- Law and Technology: On Shoring up a Void, 8 Ottawa L. Rev. 536 (1976). http://digitalcommons.law.yale.edu/fss_papers/2824/
- Book Review: Knowledge and Politics, 29 Stan. L. Rev. 879-889 1976-1977. http://digitalcommons.law.yale.edu/fss_papers/2814/
- Unspeakable Ethics, Unnatural Law, 1979 Duke L.J. 1229 (1979). http://digitalcommons.law.yale.edu/fss_papers/2826/

== Books ==
- Swindling and Selling: The Story of Legal and Illegal Congames (Free Press 1976)

== Recent theological works referencing Leff ==
- The Gospel According to Relativity
- Groothuis, Douglas (2003). Truth Decay: Defending Christianity Against the Challenges of Postmodernism. pp. 208–210. England & US: InterVarsity Press. ISBN 978-0830822287
- The Gagging of God
- Nihilism and the End of Law Nihilism and the End of Law
- The Reason for God: Belief in an Age of Skepticism (Timothy Keller: https://www.amazon.com/Reason-God-Belief-Age-Skepticism/dp/1594483493)
