= Douven =

Douven is a Dutch surname. Notable people with the name include:

- Jan Frans van Douven (1656–1727), Southern Netherlandish portrait painter
- Igor Douven, philosopher, cognitive psychologist and formal epistemologist
- Rudy Douven (born 1961), Dutch chess master
