= Helen De Cruz =

Belgian philosopher (1978–2025)

- Born: Helen Lucretia De Cruz; 1 September 1978; Ghent, Belgium
- Died: 20 June 2025 (aged 46)
- Education: UGent, Vrije Universiteit Brussel, Groningen University
- Known for: Philosophy of religion
- Scientific career
- Fields: Philosophy of religion
- Workplaces: Saint Louis University
- Doctoral advisor: Igor Douven

Helen Lucretia De Cruz (1 September 1978 – 20 June 2025) was a Belgian philosopher and Danforth Chair of Philosophy at Saint Louis University who specialised in philosophy of religion, experimental philosophy, philosophy of blogging, and philosophy of cognitive science. They were also an activist supporting the rights of EU citizens in the context of Brexit.

== Biography ==
De Cruz received their BA in archaeology and art studies and an MA in anthropology of art from Ghent University. In 2007, they completed a PhD in archaeology and art studies at Vrije Universiteit Brussel, and in 2011 they completed a PhD in philosophy at Groningen University, with a dissertation entitled Through a Mind Darkly: An Empirically informed philosophical perspective on systematic knowledge acquisition and cognitive limitations, under the supervision of Igor Douven. After post-doctoral research positions at University of Leuven and Somerville College, Oxford, they joined VU Amsterdam as an assistant professor of philosophy in 2015, before moving to Oxford Brookes University in 2016. They held the Danforth Chair of Philosophy at Saint Louis University from September 2019 onwards.

They were an Executive Editor of the Journal of Analytic Theology, and a member of the editorial boards of the Stanford Encyclopedia of Philosophy, the Journal of Mind & Behavior, and Religious Studies.

In 2014, De Cruz published a series of interviews with philosophers working outside of academia for the NewAPPS blog. They were a signatory on a 2018 open letter from academic philosophers to Amber Rudd, which urged the then home secretary to reconsider a request for asylum. The letter described a request which had been denied on the grounds that the applicant had not mentioned Plato or Aristotle when asked about humanism. The letter's signatories argued that the applicant should not have been expected to mention them.

De Cruz regularly engaged in public philosophy and was featured on several public philosophy podcasts discussing the public sphere, religious disagreement, science fiction, philosophy of science, and experimental philosophy of religion.

In addition to being a prolific philosopher, De Cruz was also a player of the Renaissance lute and a digital artist.

De Cruz died on 20 June 2025, at the age of 46.

== Books ==
- De Cruz, Helen; De Smedt, Johan (19 December 2014). A Natural History of Natural Theology: The Cognitive Science of Theology and Philosophy of Religion. MIT Press. p. 264. ISBN 9780262028547.
- De Cruz, Helen (2018). Religious Disagreement. Elements in the Philosophy of Religion. Cambridge: Cambridge University Press. ISBN 978-1-108-45731-6.
- De Cruz, Helen (26 March 2024). Wonderstruck: How Wonder and Awe Shape the Way We Think. Princeton University Press. p. 232. ISBN 9780691232126.
