= Philosophical Explanations =

1981 book by Robert Nozick

- Cover of the first edition
- Author: Robert Nozick
- Language: English
- Subjects: Epistemology; Metaphysics
- Genre: Philosophy
- Publisher: Harvard University Press
- Publication date: 1981
- Publication place: United States
- Media type: Print (Hardcover and Paperback)
- Pages: 764
- ISBN: 0-674-66479-5

Philosophical Explanations is a 1981 treatise on metaphysics, epistemology, and ethics by philosopher Robert Nozick.

The book received positive reviews. Commentators have compared Philosophical Explanations to the philosopher Richard Rorty's Philosophy and the Mirror of Nature (1979) and praised it for Nozick's discussions of the fundamental questions of philosophy and of topics such as epistemology and ethics, and welcomed it as a convincing response to charges that American academic philosophy is overly concerned with technical issues. Nozick's discussions of knowledge and skepticism have received much critical attention.

== Summary ==
Nozick discuses branches of philosophy such as metaphysics, epistemology, and ethics, specific philosophical problems concerning issues such as free will, skepticism, the mind–body problem and the problem of other minds, the nature of personal identity, and the meaning of life, and the work of individual philosophers, such as Immanuel Kant. He discusses Kant's Critique of Pure Reason (1781).

== Publication history ==
Philosophical Explanations was first published in 1981 by Harvard University Press. By 1994, it was in its eleventh printing.

== Reception ==
=== Reviews ===
Philosophical Explanations received positive reviews from the philosopher Alasdair MacIntyre in The New York Times Book Review, the philosopher Ian Hacking in The New Republic, the philosopher David Gordon in Library Journal, the political scientist Mark Lilla in The American Scholar, and the philosopher Stephen F. Barker in Harvard Educational Review. The book was also reviewed by the philosopher Robert Cummings Neville in Modern Age, the philosopher Robert Fogelin in The Journal of Philosophy, Russell Hardin in Ethics, Leslie Stevenson in the British Journal for the Philosophy of Science, George Weckman in the Journal of the American Academy of Religion, Anthony Ellis in Mind, Jeffrey Stout in The Journal of Religion, and by The Economist.

MacIntyre considered the book an important, well-written, and rewarding discussion of the central problems of philosophy, writing that it "communicates its author's own excitement about both the problems and his solutions". MacIntyre credited Nozick with showing "striking and imaginative originality" by proposing that philosophy should replace the ideal of proof with "the notion of explanation", vindicating the importance of technical discussions in the philosophy of language and the philosophy of mind with "the uses he finds for their conceptual end products", and indirectly showing "how Continental philosophers who have been explicitly concerned with human value and significance have too often presented us with impoverished and barren discussions on these great issues because they have neglected the more technical discussions of Anglo-American analytic philosophy." He also praised Nozick's discussions of the identity of the self, knowledge, free will, and skepticism, writing that they provide "splendid insights and arguments".

Hacking believed that, like the philosopher Richard Rorty's Philosophy and the Mirror of Nature, Philosophical Explanations had the potential to bring renewed public attention to philosophy in the United States. He believed that the book would also impress philosophy professors. He compared the difficulty of reading it to that of reading the Critique of Pure Reason, writing that in both works there was "apparent indifference to the reader"; he also considered Nozick's philosophical approach in some ways similar to Kant's. Gordon described the book as "amazingly original", and praised the "extraordinary elegance" of Nozick's arguments, as well as his "vigorous and enthusiastic style." Lilla wrote that the book showed the same "intellectual virtues" as Nozick's previous work Anarchy, State, and Utopia (1974), and that it "testifies to the voraciousness of his intellectual appetite." He praised Nozick's chapter on ethics as "probably the most accomplished in the book", and suggested that together with Rorty's Philosophy and the Mirror of Nature, Nozick may have helped achieve "a revival in American academic philosophy." He credited Rorty and Nozick with confronting philosophy's crisis with "careful reason, wit, and a humane concern for the fundamental questions", thereby showing that academic philosophy is still worth studying. He described both their works as "major books" that directly address the "doubt in which academic philosophy finds itself" due to charges that it is overly technical and ignores or misunderstands continental philosophy.

Barker compared the book to Philosophy and the Mirror of Nature and MacIntyre's After Virtue (1981), and described it as "powerful", brilliant, and well-written. He welcomed what he saw as Nozick's call for a "calmer and more tolerant tone in philosophical discussions" and praised Nozick's discussions of "the self" and of the metaphysical question, "Why is there something rather than nothing?". However, he maintained that some of the explanations Nozick advanced of various subjects explained them only to a limited degree.

=== Other evaluations ===
Philosophical Explanations was discussed by the National Review, Frederick Kroon in The Philosophical Quarterly, the philosopher Jim Holt in The American Scholar, the criminologist Nigel Walker in Philosophy, the philosopher Alvin Goldman in Philosophy and Phenomenological Research, and St Hope Earl McKenzie in Philosophy and Literature.

Kroon, though expressing sympathy for Nozick's view that the claim that people know many facts about an independently existing world can be reconciled with the position that people do not know that certain skeptical possibilities do not obtain, questioned whether Nozick had correctly identified how to accomplish this, and suggested that a better way was available. Holt credited Nozick with having "clever things to say about every issue in contemporary philosophy". Walker, discussing Nozick's justification of punishment, questioned his "analogy between revenge and retribution", arguing that it created problems that "raise questions about Nozick's attitude to utility." He agreed with Nozick that "satisfaction is the point of revenge" but questioned "whether it is also the point of retribution."

The philosopher Bernard Williams credited Nozick with providing "the most subtle and ingenious discussion of propositional knowledge that I know". The philosopher Jonathan Wolff observed that Nozick's discussions of knowledge and skepticism have received much critical attention. The philosopher A. R. Lacey commented that reviewers generally agree that Nozick's chapter on epistemology is the book's best chapter. He credited Nozick with usefully developing ideas first put forward by the philosopher Fred Dretske a decade or more earlier. The philosopher Michael Bratman described the book as "a rich and wide-ranging exploration of some of the deepest issues in philosophy". He praised Nozick's discussion of free will, describing it as "fascinating" and "suggestive". However, he argued that "Nozick's views about personal identity and value themselves raise a host of difficult questions."

== See also ==
- Libertarianism (metaphysics)
