= Sylvia Wenmackers =

Belgian philosopher of science

Sylvia Wenmackers (born 1980) is a Belgian philosopher of science and BOF Research professor in the Centre for Logic and Philosophy of Science of philosophy at KU Leuven. Her research has involved the philosophy of probability and time, and the application of non-standard analysis to probability.

== Education and career ==
Wenmackers was born in 1980 in Maasmechelen. She received a bachelor's degree in physics in 2000 from Hasselt University, then called Limburgs Universitair Centrum, and continued to study physics at Ghent University, received a master's degree at Ghent University in 2002. She returned to Hasselt University for doctoral study in materials science, working there on diamond-based biosensors, and completed a Ph.D. in 2008, jointly promoted by Patrick Wagner and Miloš Nesládek. She continued this work as a postdoctoral researcher before switching fields to the philosophy of science, in which she obtained a second Ph.D. in 2011 at the University of Groningen in The Netherlands. Her dissertation, Philosophy of probability: Foundations, epistemology, and computation, was supervised by Igor Douven.

She remained at Groningen as a postdoctoral researcher, supported in part by the Dutch Research Council (NWO) Talent Programme, until joining KU Leuven as a tenure-track BOF Research professor in 2014. She was co-president of the Belgian Young Academy from 2019 to 2021.

== Personal life ==
Wenmackers is married to Danny Vanpoucke, a materials scientist at Hasselt University; they have a son. She is a proponent of solarpunk, an artistic and cultural movement centered on the idea of a sustainable future, and has described her dream project as being the installation of a solarpunk mural on one of her university's buildings.

== Books ==
Wenmackers is the author of two books in the Dutch language:

- Kans op Chocoladetaart: Proeven van wetenschap [Chance of chocolate cake: tasting science] (2019)
- Wetenschap [Science] (2021)
