= Utility monster =

Thought experiment critiquing utilitarianism

The utility monster is a thought experiment in the study of ethics created by philosopher Robert Nozick in 1974 as a criticism of utilitarianism.

== The thought experiment ==
A hypothetical being, which Nozick calls the utility monster, receives much more utility from each unit of a resource that it consumes than anyone else does. For instance, eating an apple might bring only one unit of pleasure to an ordinary person, but could bring 100 units of pleasure to a utility monster. If the utility monster can get so much pleasure from each unit of resources, it follows from utilitarianism that the distribution of resources should acknowledge this. If the utility monster existed, it would justify the mistreatment and perhaps annihilation of everyone else, according to the mandates of utilitarianism, because, for the utility monster, the pleasure it receives outweighs the suffering it may cause. Nozick writes:

Utilitarian theory is embarrassed by the possibility of utility monsters who get enormously greater sums of utility from any sacrifice of others than these others lose ... the theory seems to require that we all be sacrificed in the monster's maw, in order to increase total utility.

This thought experiment attempts to show that utilitarianism is not actually egalitarian, even though it appears to be at first glance.

The experiment contends that there is no way of aggregating utility which can circumvent the conclusion that all units should be given to a utility monster, because it is possible to tailor a monster to any given system.

For example, Rawls's maximin considers a group's utility to be the same as the utility of the member who is worst off. The "happy" utility monster of total utilitarianism is ineffective against maximin, because as soon as a monster has received enough utility to no longer be the worst-off in the group, there's no need to accommodate it. But maximin has its own monster: an unhappy (worst-off) being who only gains a tiny amount of utility no matter how many resources are given to it, and thereby would receive the maximum proportion of resources possible without reducing others to a similar state of unhappiness.

== History ==
Robert Nozick, a twentieth century American philosopher, coined the term "utility monster" in response to Jeremy Bentham's philosophy of utilitarianism. Nozick proposed that accepting the theory of utilitarianism causes the necessary acceptance of the condition that some people would use this to justify exploitation of others. An individual (or specific group) would claim their entitlement to more "happy units" than they claim others deserve, and the others would consequently be left to receive fewer "happy units".

Nozick deems these exploiters "utility monsters" (and for ease of understanding, they might also be thought of as "happiness hogs"). Nozick poses that utility monsters justify their greediness with the idea or feeling that, compared to others, being in the world inflicts greater inequality or sadness on them, and therefore they deserve more happy units to bridge this gap. Anyone not in the utility monster group (or not a utility monster individual) is left to split the fewer remaining happy units with others like themselves. Utility monsters would state that the others are happier in the world to begin with, so they do not need the "extra" happy units they would like to lay claim to.

== Social implications ==
=== Population ===
The utility monster has been invoked in debates about population. Derek Parfit's mere addition paradox suggests that additional humans would add to total happiness, even if expanding population decreases average happiness. This is known as the "repugnant conclusion" that the world would be better off with a very large group of people with lives barely worth living than with a small group of people with excellent lives. Parfit suggests that Nozick's utility monster is misleading because it appeals to our intuitions about a being which experiences more than a million times the utility of a very well-off ordinary person, which is, he thinks, inconceivable. The implication is a more common-sense continuous scale of happiness change, from great to nil, based on scarcity of units, the happiness increasing from an additional unit of resource only inversely proportional to the existing pool of units.

=== Digital minds ===
Some scholars believe it likely that superintelligent machines or other digital minds will be built at some point in the future. Some such machines might be engineered to use material resources vastly more efficiently than humans to achieve happiness, due to better energy efficiency, a faster rate of subjective experience, or greater durations and intensity of pleasure. If their well-being is included in a utility calculation, such machines could constitute "utility monsters", although the non-pejorative term "super-beneficiary" may be preferred.

== See also ==
- Average and total utilitarianism
- Effective altruism
- Experience machine
- Happiness pump
- Price of fairness
- Wirehead (science fiction)
