= A Theory of Justice =

1971 book by John Rawls

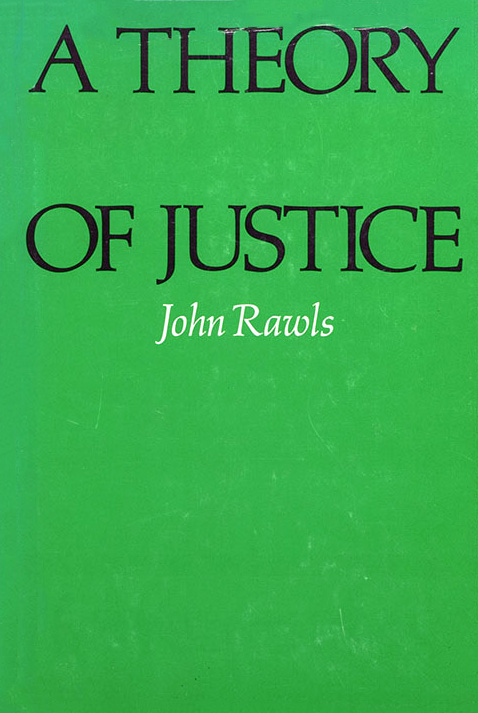
- Cover of the first American edition
- Author: John Rawls
- Language: English
- Subject: Distributive justice
- Publisher: Belknap Press
- Publication date: 1971
- Publication place: United States
- Media type: Print (hardcover · paperback)
- Pages: 560
- ISBN: 978-0-674-00078-0
- Dewey Decimal: 320/.01/1 21
- LC Class: JC578 .R38 1999

A Theory of Justice is a 1971 work of political philosophy and ethics by the philosopher John Rawls (1921–2002) in which the author attempts to provide a moral theory alternative to utilitarianism and that addresses the problem of distributive justice (the socially just distribution of goods in a society). The theory uses an updated form of Kantian philosophy and a variant form of conventional social contract theory. Rawls's theory of justice is fully a political theory of justice as opposed to other forms of justice discussed in other disciplines and contexts.

The resultant theory was challenged and refined several times in the decades following its original publication in 1971. A significant reappraisal was published in the 1985 essay "Justice as Fairness" and the 2001 book Justice as Fairness: A Restatement in which Rawls further developed his two central principles for his discussion of justice. Together, they assert that society should be structured to provide the greatest possible degree of liberty to its members, limited only by the principle that one individual's liberty must not infringe upon the liberty of others. Secondly, inequalities – either social or economic – are only to be allowed if the worst off will be better off than they might be under an equal distribution. Finally, if an inequality is to be justified on the grounds of its benefits, it must not create additional barriers for those without resources to access positions of power, such as public office.

== Objective ==
In A Theory of Justice, Rawls argues for a principled reconciliation of liberty and equality that is meant to apply to the basic structure of a well-ordered society. Central to this effort is an account of the circumstances of justice, inspired by David Hume, and a fair choice situation for parties facing such circumstances, similar to some of Immanuel Kant's views. Principles of justice are sought to guide the conduct of the parties. These parties are recognized to face moderate scarcity, and they are neither naturally altruistic nor purely egoistic. They have ends which they seek to advance but prefer to advance them through cooperation with others on mutually acceptable terms. Rawls offers a model of a fair choice situation (the original position with its veil of ignorance) within which parties would hypothetically choose mutually acceptable principles of justice. Under such constraints, Rawls believes that parties would find his favoured principles of justice to be especially attractive, winning out over varied alternatives, including utilitarian and right-wing libertarian accounts.

== The "original position" ==
Rawls belongs to the social contract tradition, although he takes a different view from that of previous thinkers. Specifically, Rawls develops what he claims are principles of justice through the use of an artificial device or thought experiment he calls the Original position; in which, everyone decides principles of justice from behind a veil of ignorance. This "veil" is one that essentially blinds people to all facts about themselves so they cannot tailor principles to their own advantage:

[N]o one knows his place in society, his class position or social status, nor does anyone know his fortune in the distribution of natural assets and abilities, his intelligence, strength, and the like. I shall even assume that the parties do not know their conceptions of the good or their special psychological propensities. The principles of justice are chosen behind a veil of ignorance.

According to Rawls, ignorance of such details enable the isolation of principles around which the structure of a fair society can be agreed upon:

They are the principles that rational and free persons concerned to further their own interests would accept in an initial position of equality as defining the fundamentals of the terms of their association.

If an individual does not know how he will end up in his own conceived society, he is likely not going to privilege any one class of people, but rather develop a scheme of justice that treats all fairly.

In particular, Rawls claims that those in the Original Position would adopt two principles, the second of which is a maximin strategy which would maximize the prospects of the least well-off.

Rawls bases his Original Position on a "thin theory of the good" which he says "explains the rationality underlying choice of principles in the Original Position". A full theory of the good follows after we derive principles from the original position. Rawls claims that the parties in the original position would adopt two such principles, which would then govern the assignment of rights and duties and regulate the distribution of social and economic advantages across society. The difference principle permits inequalities in the distribution of goods only if those inequalities benefit the worst-off members of society. Rawls believes that this principle would be a rational choice for the representatives in the original position for the following reason: Each member of society has an equal claim on their society's goods. Natural attributes should not affect this claim, so the basic right of any individual, before further considerations are taken into account, must be to an equal share in material wealth. What, then, could justify unequal distribution? Rawls argues that inequality is acceptable only if it is to the advantage of those who are worst-off.

The agreement that stems from the original position is both hypothetical and ahistorical. It is hypothetical in the sense that the principles to be derived are what the parties would, under certain legitimating conditions, agree to, not what they have agreed to. Rawls seeks to use an argument that the principles of justice are what would be agreed upon if people were in the hypothetical situation of the original position and that those principles have moral weight as a result of that. It is ahistorical in the sense that it is not supposed that the agreement has ever been, or indeed could ever have been, derived in the real world outside of carefully limited experimental exercises.

== The principles of justice ==
Rawls modifies and develops the principles of justice throughout his book. In chapter forty-six, Rawls makes his final clarification on the two principles of justice:

1. Each person is to have an equal right to the most extensive total system of equal basic liberties compatible with a similar system of liberty for all.

2. Social and economic inequalities are to be arranged so that they are both:

(a) to the greatest benefit of the least advantaged, consistent with the just savings principle, and
(b) attached to offices and positions open to all under conditions of fair equality of opportunity.

The first principle is often called the greatest equal liberty principle. Part (a) of the second principle is referred to as the difference principle while part (b) is referred to as the equal opportunity principle.

Rawls orders the principles of justice lexically, as follows: 1, 2b, 2a. The greatest equal liberty principle takes priority, followed by the equal opportunity principle and finally the difference principle. The first principle must be satisfied before 2b, and 2b must be satisfied before 2a. As Rawls states: "A principle does not come into play until those previous to it are either fully met or do not apply." Therefore, the equal basic liberties protected in the first principle cannot be traded or sacrificed for greater social advantages (granted by 2(b)) or greater economic advantages (granted by 2a).

=== The greatest equal liberty principle ===
Each person is to have an equal right to the most extensive total system of equal basic liberties compatible with a similar system of liberty for all (1).

The greatest equal liberty principle is mainly concerned with the distribution of rights and liberties. Rawls identifies the following equal basic liberties: "political liberty (the right to vote and hold public office) and freedom of speech and assembly; liberty of conscience and freedom of thought; freedom of the person, which includes freedom from psychological oppression and physical assault and dismemberment (integrity of the person); the right to hold personal property and freedom from arbitrary arrest and seizure as defined by the concept of the rule of law."

It is a matter of some debate whether freedom of contract can be inferred to be included among these basic liberties: "liberties not on the list, for example, the right to own certain kinds of property and freedom of contract as understood by the doctrine of laissez-faire are not basic; and so they are not protected by the priority of the first principle.".

=== The difference principle ===
Social and economic inequalities are to be arranged so that they are (a) to the greatest benefit of the least advantaged members of society, consistent with the just savings principle (2a).

Rawls' claim in (a) is that departures from equality of a list of what he calls primary goods—"things which a rational man wants whatever else he wants" are justified only to the extent that they improve the lot of those who are worst-off under that distribution in comparison with the previous, equal, distribution. His position is at least in some sense egalitarian, with a provision that inequalities are allowed when they benefit the least advantaged. An important consequence of Rawls' view is that inequalities can actually be just, as long as they are to the benefit of the least well off. His argument for this position rests heavily on the claim that morally arbitrary factors (for example, the family one is born into) should not determine one's life chances or opportunities. Rawls is also oriented to an intuition that a person does not morally deserve their inborn talents; thus, that one is not entitled to all the benefits they could possibly receive from them; hence, at least one of the criteria which could provide an alternative to equality in assessing the justice of distributions is eliminated.

Further, the just savings principle requires that some sort of material respect is left for future generations. Although Rawls is ambiguous about what this means, it can generally be understood as "a contribution to those coming later".

=== The equal opportunity principle ===
Social and economic inequalities are to be arranged so that they are (b) attached to offices and positions open to all under conditions of fair equality of opportunity (2b).

The stipulation in 2b is lexically prior to that in 2a. This is because equal opportunity requires not merely that offices and positions are distributed on the basis of merit, but that all have reasonable opportunity to acquire the skills on the basis of which merit is assessed, even if one might not have the necessary material resources - due to a beneficial inequality stemming from the difference principle.

It may be thought that this stipulation, and even the first principle of justice, may require greater equality than the difference principle, because large social and economic inequalities, even when they are to the advantage of the worst-off, will tend to seriously undermine the value of the political liberties and any measures towards fair equality of opportunity.

== Influence and reception ==
In 1972, A Theory of Justice was reviewed in The New York Times Book Review by Marshall Cohen, who described the work as "magisterial," and suggested that Rawls' use of the techniques of analytic philosophy made the book the "most formidable" defense of the social contract tradition to date. He credited Rawls with showing that the widespread claim that "systematic moral and political philosophy are dead" is mistaken, and with providing a "bold and rigorous" account of "the principles to which our public life is committed." Though he suggested that it might take years before a satisfactory appraisal of the work could be made, he noted that Rawls' accomplishments had been compared by scholars to those of John Stuart Mill and Immanuel Kant. However, he criticized Rawls for "looseness in his understanding of some fundamental political concepts."

A Theory of Justice received criticism from several philosophers. Robert Nozick criticized Rawls' account of distributive justice in his defense of libertarianism, Anarchy, State, and Utopia (1974). Allan Bloom, writing in American Political Science Review in 1975, noted that A Theory of Justice had "attracted more attention in the Anglo-Saxon world than any work of its kind in a generation", attributing its popularity to its being "the most ambitious political project undertaken by a member of the school currently dominant in academic philosophy" and to Rawls’s "radical egalitarian interpretation of liberal democracy." Bloom criticized Rawls for failing to account for the existence of natural right in his theory of justice and wrote that Rawls absolutizes social union as the ultimate goal which would conventionalize everything into artifice. Robert Paul Wolff criticized Rawls from a Marxist perspective in Understanding Rawls: A Critique and Reconstruction of A Theory of Justice (1977), arguing Rawls offers an apology for the status quo insofar as he constructs justice from existing practice and forecloses the possibility that there may be problems of injustice embedded in capitalist social relations, private property or the market economy.

Michael Sandel criticized Rawls in Liberalism and the Limits of Justice (1982), arguing that Rawls encourages people to think about justice while divorced from the values and aspirations that define who they are as persons and that allow people to determine what justice is. Susan Moller Okin wrote in Justice, Gender, and the Family (1989) that Rawls had provided "the most influential of all twentieth-century theories of justice", but criticized him for failing to account for the injustices and hierarchies embedded in familial relations. Economists Kenneth Arrow and John Harsanyi criticized the assumptions of the original position, and in particular, the use of maximin reasoning, with the implication that Rawls' selection of parameters for the original position was result-oriented, i.e., calculated to derive the two principles that Rawls desired to advance, and/or, as the "contractarian critique" holds, that the persons in the original position articulated by Rawls would not in fact select the principles that A Theory of Justice advocates. In reply Rawls emphasized the role of the original position as a "device of representation" for making sense of the idea of a fair choice situation for free and equal citizens, and that the relatively modest role that maximin plays in his argument: it is "a useful heuristic rule of thumb" given the curious features of choice behind the veil of ignorance.

In his book Black Rights / White Wrongs, philosopher Charles W. Mills critiques the underlying assumptions of Rawls’s work as inherently white, and thus subject to glaring blind spots. Mills sets “the white fantasy world of Rawlsianism” and its “ideal theory” against the actual history of racialized oppression in the modern era, and proposes that non-ideal theory is urgently needed to address racial inequality and possible remediations. “Here is a huge body of work," Mills writes on Rawls's output, "focused on questions of social justice – seemingly the natural place to look for guidance on normative issues related to race – which has nothing to say about racial justice, the distinctive injustice of the modern world.” Mills identified what he described as a "pattern of silence" on issues of race in Rawls's work and situated it within a broader critique of the treatment of race in modern political philosophy.

The economist Amartya Sen has raised concerns over Rawls' emphasis on primary social goods, arguing in Inequality Reexamined (1992) that we should attend not only to the distribution of primary goods, but also how effectively people are able to use those goods to pursue their ends. Norman Daniels has wondered why health care should not be treated as a primary good, and some of his subsequent work has addressed this question, arguing for a right to health care within a broadly Rawlsian framework. Sen critiques and attempts to revitalize A Theory of Justice in The Idea of Justice (2009). He credits Rawls for revitalizing the interest in the ideas of what justice means and the stress put on fairness, objectivity, equality of opportunity, removal of poverty, and freedom. However, Sen, as part of his general critique of the contractarian tradition, states that ideas about a perfectly just world do not help redress actual existing inequality. Sen faults Rawls for overemphasizing institutions as guarantors of justice and not considering the effects of human behaviour on the institutions' ability to maintain a just society. Sen believes Rawls understates the difficulty in getting everyone in society to adhere to the norms of a just society. He also claims that Rawls' position that there be only one possible outcome of the reflective equilibrium behind the veil of ignorance is misguided. In contrast to Rawls, Sen believes that multiple conflicting, yet just, principles may arise and that this undermines the multistep processes that Rawls laid out as leading to a perfectly just society.

The philosopher G. A. Cohen, in If You're An Egalitarian, How Come You're So Rich? (2000) and Rescuing Justice and Equality (2008), criticizes Rawls' avowal of inequality under the difference principle, his application of the principle only to social institutions, and what he sees as Rawls's obsession with using primary goods as his currency of equality. Cohen argued that Rawls's principles of justice are influenced by assumptions about social institutions and human behaviour. He maintained that a theory of justice should identify principles that are fundamentally just independently of practical considerations, and therefore contended that Rawls's account was not a theory of justice in the strict sense.

== In popular culture ==
A Theory of Justice inspired a 2013 musical, A Theory of Justice: The Musical!, written and produced by Eylon Levy, Ramin Sabi, Tommy Peto, and Toby Huelin.

== See also ==
- American philosophy
- Ken Binmore
- Robert Nozick
- Friedrich Hayek
- Lexical order
- Lottery of birth
- Redistribution of wealth
- Social liberalism
- Thought experiment
- Social contract theory
