= Lockean proviso =

Feature of John Locke's labor theory of property

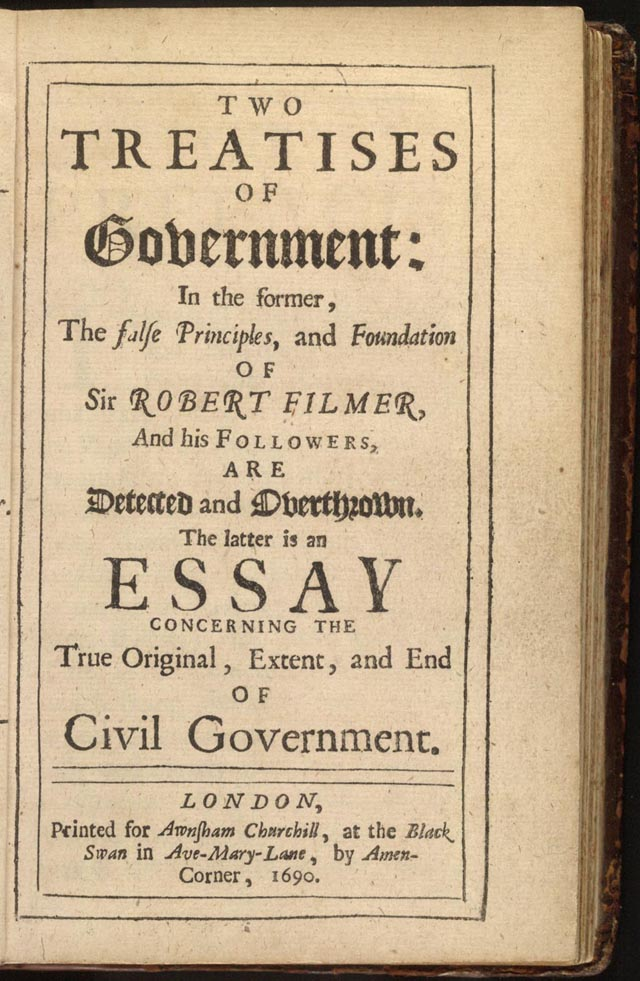
Locke's Two Treatises on Government

The term "Lockean proviso" was coined in 1974 by Robert Nozick to describe an interpretation of John Locke's labor theory of property, which states that whilst individuals have a right to homestead private property from nature by working on it, they can do so only if "there was still enough, and as good left; and more than the yet unprovided could use".

== Locke's formulation ==
Preliminary wording central to Locke's concept of property is set out in Chapter V, paragraph 27 of his Second Treatise of Government:

Though the earth, and all inferior creatures, be common to all men, yet every man has a property in his own person: this no body has any right to but himself. The labour of his body, and the work of his hands, we may say, are properly his. Whatsoever then he removes out of the state that nature hath provided, and left it in, he hath mixed his labour with, and joined to it something that is his own, and thereby makes it his property. It being by him removed from the common state nature hath placed it in, it hath by this labour something annexed to it, that excludes the common right of other men: for this labour being the unquestionable property of the labourer, no man but he can have a right to what that is once joined to, at least where there is enough, and as good, left in common for others.

— John Locke, Second Treatise of Government, Chapter V, paragraph 27

His proviso is then formulated as follows:

Nor was this appropriation of any parcel of land, by improving it, any prejudice to any other man, since there was still enough and as good left, and more than the yet unprovided could use. So that, in effect, there was never the less left for others because of his enclosure for himself. For he that leaves as much as another can make use of, does as good as take nothing at all. Nobody could think himself injured by the drinking of another man, though he took a good draught, who had a whole river of the same water left him to quench his thirst. And the case of land and water, where there is enough of both, is perfectly the same.

— John Locke, Second Treatise of Government, Chapter V, paragraph 33

=== Agreement ===
The phrase "Lockean proviso" was coined in 1974 by American libertarian political philosopher Robert Nozick in Anarchy, State, and Utopia. It is based on the ideas elaborated by Locke in his Second Treatise of Government, namely that self-ownership allows a person the freedom to mix his or her labor with natural resources, converting common property into private property. Locke concludes that people need to be able to protect the resources they are using to live on their property and that this is a natural right. Nozick used this idea to form his Lockean proviso which governs the initial acquisition of property in a society, but in order for his ideas of ownership of property to get off the ground and be cogent he devised the criterion to determine what makes property acquisition just, which is the proviso. The proviso says that although every appropriation of property is a diminution of another's rights to it, it is acceptable as long as it does not make anyone worse off than they would have been without any private property.

In Georgism, the possession of land is proper only so long as the market rent is paid to the relevant community. If a plot of land has a positive rent, that implies that there is not land of similar quality freely available to others. Locke's proviso has also been used by socialists and universal basic income advocates to point to land acquisition as illegitimate without compensation.

=== Critique ===
American libertarians of the modern Austrian School and anarcho-capitalist traditions, such as Murray Rothbard, have accepted Locke's other views on property whilst rejecting the Lockean proviso. Some take the American anarcho-capitalist economist Walter Block and his rejection of the Lockean proviso to be grounds for a Blockian proviso more in line with the very "logic of homesteading". French researcher Ai-Thu Dang criticized Nozick's reading of the Lockean proviso, saying it denatures its meaning, especially Locke's "articulation to moral rules governing enrichment".

Socialist critics of the proviso, such as G. A. Cohen, point to the issue that the proviso does not take into account previously existing inequalities. Cohen describes the Lockean proviso's first-come-first-served approach as "morally dubious". He uses the example of someone claiming a beach as "their own" and charging admission in exchange for lifeguarding service. This would satisfy the proviso because it does not make anyone's life worse but fails to consider how much better off everyone would be if someone owned the beach and charged only 50 cents for better service. He continues that this superior alternative is never considered under Nozick's proviso.

Karl Widerquist and Grant McCall argue that even weak versions of the proviso, such as the one used by Nozick, are unfulfilled by contemporary societies. The poorest people today, even in wealthy nations, are worse off than they could reasonably expect to be in a stateless hunter-gatherer band that treats the environment as commons that cannot be owned by anyone. They write, "Establishing hunter-gatherer quality-of-life as the baseline for comparison sets an extremely low bar. The tragedy of state societies today is that for all their wealth and achievement they have so consistently failed to surpass that bar."

Thomas Pogge doubts whether "enough, and as good" was available to all in Locke's time: "It is hard to believe that Locke’s claim was true in his time." "In any case", in proposing an alternative global order needed in current times, he argues that "it is surely false on the global plane today".

== See also ==
- Classical liberalism
- Estate in land
- Geolibertarianism
- Land (economics)
- Land law
- Land reform
- Land value tax
