= The Nature of Rationality =

1993 book by Robert Nozick

- Cover
- Author: Robert Nozick
- Language: English
- Subject: Practical rationality
- Published: 1993
- Publisher: Princeton University Press
- Publication place: United States
- Media type: Print (Hardcover and Paperback)
- Pages: 226
- ISBN: 0-691-02096-5

The Nature of Rationality is 1993 book by the philosopher Robert Nozick in which he explores practical rationality.

== Publication history ==
The Nature of Rationality was first published in 1993 by Princeton University Press.
