= Igor Douven =

- Born: 1963 (age 62–63)
- Education: Maastricht University; Utrecht University; KU Leuven
- Scientific career
- Fields: Philosophy, psychology
- Workplaces: KU Leuven; University of Groningen; Paris 8 University
- Doctoral students: Helen de Cruz; Sylvia Wenmackers

Igor Douven (born 1963) is a Dutch philosopher, cognitive psychologist and formal epistemologist, known for coordinating the research group Formal Epistemology: Foundations and Applications at the KU Leuven.

In 2010 he became Endowed Chair in philosophy at the University of Groningen. In 2013, he joined the "Probability, Assessment, Reasoning and Inferences Studies" research group at Paris 8 University.

== Selected publications ==
- "Wouldn't It Be Lovely: Explanation and Scientific Realism", Metascience 14, 3 (2006) 331–361. (Review Symposium on the second edition of Inference to the Best Explanation, with James Ladyman, Igor Douven and Bas van Fraassen.)
- Douven, Igor. "Abduction". In Zalta, Edward N. (ed.). Stanford Encyclopedia of Philosophy. ISSN 1095-5054. OCLC 429049174.
