= Anarchy, State, and Utopia =

1974 book by Robert Nozick

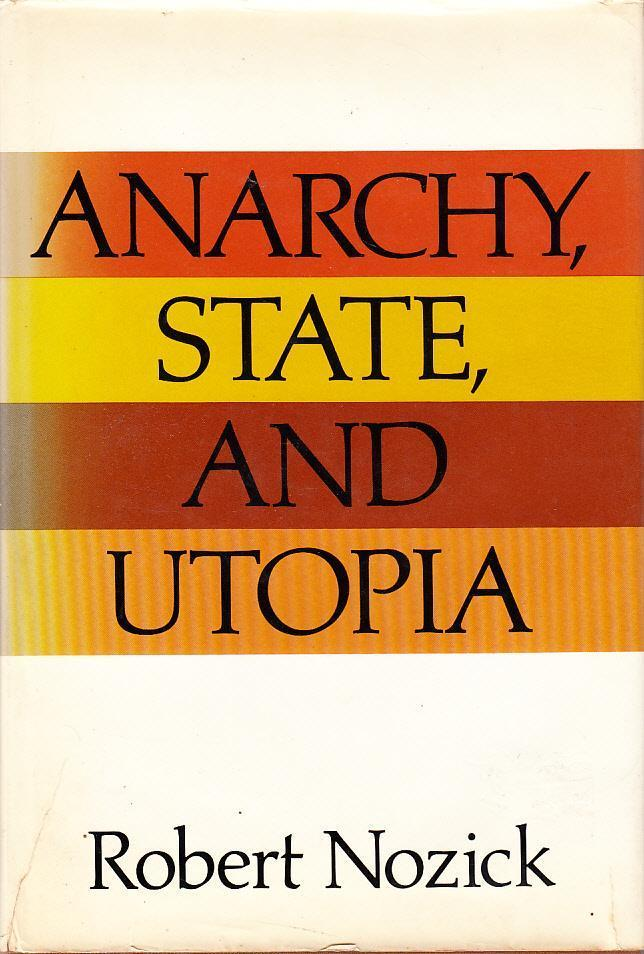
- Cover of the first edition
- Author: Robert Nozick
- Language: English
- Subject: Distributive justice
- Publisher: Basic Books
- Publication date: 1974
- Publication place: United States
- Media type: Print (hardcover and paperback)
- Pages: 334
- ISBN: 978-0465097203
- Dewey Decimal: 320.1/01
- LC Class: JC571 .N68

Anarchy, State, and Utopia (ASU) is a 1974 book by the American philosopher Robert Nozick. A work of analytic philosophy in the libertarian capitalist tradition, it popularised and developed the concepts of the night-watchman state, entitlement theory of property, and Lockean proviso, employing original thought experiments, such as the utility monster, experience machine, Wilt Chamberlain argument, and demoktesis, an experiment with the aim of demonstrating a progressive loss in self-ownership in democratic government.

In opposition to A Theory of Justice (1971) by John Rawls, and in debate with Michael Walzer, Nozick argues in favor of a minimal state, "limited to the narrow functions of protection against force, theft, fraud, enforcement of contracts, and so on".

As a work of analytic philosophy, the work offers an original interpretation and synthesis of the Lockean state of nature, Immanuel Kant's theory of persons being and in themselves, and economic research in game theory and welfare economics. Though highly controversial, the book was acclaimed by philosophers, political theorists, and American libertarians.

== Background ==
Anarchy, State, and Utopia came out of a semester-long course that Nozick taught with Michael Walzer at Harvard in 1971, called Capitalism and Socialism. The course was a debate between the two; Nozick's side was later detailed in Anarchy, State, and Utopia, and Walzer's side produced his Spheres of Justice (1983).

Nozick further envisioned ASU as a response to John Rawls' A Theory of Justice (1971), challenging, in particular, Rawls's second principle that "social and economic inequalities are to be arranged so that they are to be of greatest benefit to the least-advantaged members of society."

=== Intellectual history ===
In writing the book, Nozick was particularly influenced by John Locke, Immanuel Kant, and Friedrich Hayek. Nozick frames the first part of the book through John Locke's state of nature and draws on the Kantian idea that individuals are separate persons who may not simply be used for the benefit of others.

==== Rawls's A Theory of Justice ====
Nozick presents Part II of the book as an argument that no state more extensive than the minimal state can be justified. In developing his entitlement theory, he concentrates on Rawls's account of distributive justice and the difference principle.

==== H. L. A. Hart's fairness principle ====
Nozick also discusses a principle proposed by H. L. A. Hart and called the "principle of fairness" by Rawls. On this principle, participants in a just and mutually advantageous cooperative practice may require similar restraint from those who accept the practice's benefits.

=== Reception ===
Following its publication in 1974, ASU won the 1975 US National Book Award in category Philosophy and Religion, has been translated into 11 languages, and was named one of the "100 most influential books since the war" (1945–1995) by the UK Times Literary Supplement. ASU remains particularly popular among American libertarian circles as a canonical intellectual articulation of libertarianism. As such, Nozick, alongside Murray Rothbard and Ayn Rand, became regarded as the leading intellectual leaders of libertarianism, although Nozick did not publish substantive work in political philosophy after 1974.

Philosopher Jan Narveson described Nozick's book as "brilliant". In 1991, Jonathan Wolff published Robert Nozick: Property, Justice and the Minimal State, a general overview of the debate around Nozick's political philosophy.

==== Criticism ====
G. A. Cohen criticized Nozick's libertarian-style concept of property rights and the proprietary freedom view.

In the article "Social Unity and Primary Goods", republished in his Collected Papers (1999), Rawls notes that Nozick handles the liberal paradox in a manner that is similar to his own. However, the rights that Nozick takes to be fundamental and the basis for regarding them to be such are different from the equal basic liberties included in justice as fairness and Rawls conjectures that they are thus not inalienable.

In Lectures on the History of Political Philosophy (2007), Rawls notes that Nozick assumes that just transactions are "justice preserving" in much the same way that logical operations are "truth preserving". Thus, Nozick holds that repetitive applications of "justice in holdings" and "justice in transfer" preserve an initial state of justice obtained through "justice in acquisition or rectification". Rawls points out that this is simply an assumption or presupposition and requires substantiation. In reality, he maintains, small inequalities established by just transactions accumulate over time and eventually result in large inequalities and an unjust situation.

== Moral and political philosophy ==
=== Invisible-hand arguments ===
Nozick begins the book laying the epistemic groundwork for his theory of state. Principally, he seeks to rely upon John Locke's social contractarian theory, particularly Locke's state of nature thought experiment, in justifying the existence of the state, by way of counterfactual, as opposed to anarchy.

In justifying his philosophic methodology, Nozick offers an original interpretation of the invisible hand concept in economics, conceiving of a broader class of "invisible hand" explanations of social phenomena, which would appear to be the product of "intelligent design", but which actually arises out of spontaneous mechanisms that naturally result in an equilibrium. Nozick distinguishes invisible hand explanations from "intelligent design" explanations, on the basis that the latter merely rely upon the intention of the designer and as such are less satisfying than the former. As an example, Nozick provides an equilibrium explanation for the adoption of fiat currencies in a hypothetical society, rebutting Locke's view that a social contract is necessary to establish the common usage of money.

In a similar vein, Nozick aims to explain the state in terms of the nonpolitical by means of a state-of-nature argument, believing that such an explanation is more "fundamental" than a political one, even if no state ever actually developed in the social contractarian way. Concretely, his attempt is to describe the appearance of the state in relation to morally permissible and impermissible actions within a non-political society, and to show how violations of those constraints by some individuals would lead to the emergence of a state.

The anarcho-capitalist economist Murray Rothbard has criticised this "invisible hand" methodology, likening it to an "immaculate conception of the state". He argues that, as no existing state has actually developed by such an 'invisible hand' process of social contract, Nozick should, by his own reasoning, simply "advocate anarchism" and then "wait for his State to develop". At the same time, Rothbard argues that the "invisible hand" process would, in fact, move society from his minimal State "back to anarchism".

=== Ultraminimalist statism ===
Applying his methodology and the division of labor concept, Nozick moves to consider the possibility of professional protective associations, where one pays a fee in exchange for protection and not having to be on call to assist another. Nozick states that in such a model, because of economic phenomena, such as the economies of scale effect, people within a given geographic area will all join the strongest association, thus creating a monopoly market, or a market with monopolistic features. This scenario, apparently, is "very much resembling a minimal state"; however, it would also appear that the protective firm does not have a true monopoly of force (following Max Weber's definition of state), nor does it protect every individual within the geographic area.

Nozick argues that such an association, although differing from the ordinary understanding of statehood, is, in fact, an ultraminimal "state". This dominant agency has a de facto and economic monopoly on force, owing to the "might" of the agency and its corresponding ability to enforce rules. Though such a monopoly does not correspond precisely with Weber's conception of the state as "the sole authorizer of violence", since some independents may conduct violence to one another without intervention, it is the sole effective judge over the permissibility of violence, and should be regarded as a "statelike entity." Nozick also claims that a society with such an entity will 'diverge greatly... from what anthropologists call a stateless society', as it shares in many of the institutional features that states have, such as 'enduring administrative structures' and 'full-time specialized personnel'.

Nozick distinguishes this association, which he calls "an ultraminimal state", which monopolizes the enforcement of rights but protects only paying clients, from a minimal state that provides protection to everyone in its territory. Nozick shows that the ultraminimalist state may justifiably become a minimal state if it gives universal protection. This involves what Nozick regards as compensation, rather than distribution, to persons who are disadvantaged and cannot pay for protection. In other words, Nozick argues the universal protection provided does not violate anybody's rights and does not redistribute wealth by making its clients pay for the protection of others, because the people who are given money or protective services at a discount had a right to this as a compensation for the disadvantages forced upon them.

==== Minimal statism ====
According to Nozick, the emergence of a state from protective associations shows that some states could be formed by a series of legitimate and morally permissible steps, rebutting the anarchist view that every state is necessarily illegitimate. Thus, Nozick arrives at what he regards as the night-watchman state of classical liberalism theory. Nozick, nonetheless, notes that the step from being just a de facto monopoly (the ultraminimal state) to the minimal state that compensates some independents is not a necessary one, but that compensation is ultimately a kind of deontic obligation, which arises from Nozick's invisible hand explanation.

=== Rights as side constraints ===
Arguing against the "utilitarianism of rights", Nozick defends a Kantian formulation of rights as respecting the principle individuals are ends and not merely means. Hence, rights, in Nozick's view, are not merely political goals to be respected, but they are more fundamentally "side constraints" on action, which cannot be violated to avoid violations of the rights of other people. For example, it would be wrong to punish another person they know to be innocent in order to calm down a mob that would otherwise violate even more rights.

The American legal scholar Arthur Allen Leff regards Nozick's assertion, here, that "individuals have rights which may not be violated by other individuals", as lacking any substantive justification in the book. Leff further regards Nozick's view as plainly wrong, arguing that any desired ethical statement, including a negation of Nozick's position, can easily be "proved" with apparent rigor as long as one takes the licence to simply establish a grounding principle by assertion.

==== Utility monster and experience machine ====
In order to justify his night-watchman theory of state, Nozick sets out to rebut classical utilitarianism theory. His most famous arguments are the thought experiments of the experience machine and the utility monster. The former conceives of a so-called "experience machine" that allows one to permanently enter into whatever felt experience one might want, but it prevents the subject from doing anything or making contact with anything. If classical utilitarianism is true, then, Nozick argues, one, driven by felt experience, would want to plug themselves into the machine forever; but this is not in reality the case, for there are articulable reasons why one may not wish to do so, such as remaining in contact with reality. The latter conceives of a so-called utility monster, a being that derives more utility per resource than any other agent, such that, under classic utilitarian theory, most if not all resources should be diverted to this monster at the expense of everyone else.

==== Non-aggression principle ====
Nozick also offers a number of other arguments in favor of Kantian deontology. First, he argues against the notion that people can be morally used as a means to an end, that is, that the interests of one individual may be sacrificed for the greater social good, on the basis that it would be immoral to fail to "respect and take account of the fact that [an individual] is a separate person, that [this] is the only life [they] have." Second, he argues for the non-aggression principle. Third, he compares humans to animals, inquiring as to whether animals have rights too or whether they can be "used". He highlights that the utilitarian calculation of happiness would entail that killing animals painlessly would be acceptable, at the same time rejecting the proposal of "utilitarianism for animals, Kantianism for people".

Josh Milburn has analyzed the book’s brief discussion of the moral status of animals and argued that, when it is read alongside passages about animals in Nozick’s other works, it entails that “we have strong moral obligations towards them, whatever our political obligations.” Indeed, Nozick at one point in ASU briefly comments in favour of ethical vegetarianism. Milburn has further argued that Nozick's contributions have been overlooked in the literature on both animal ethics and libertarianism.

=== Theory of justice ===
Nozick's entitlement theory distinguishes justice in acquisition, justice in transfer, and the rectification of past injustice. A holding is just when it arises through repeated applications of the principles of acquisition and transfer, subject to rectification where those principles have been violated. The theory is historical rather than an end-state theory: the justice of a distribution depends on how it arose, not solely on its resulting pattern.

==== Difference principle ====
Nozick questions why the gains from social cooperation must be arranged to maximize the position of the least advantaged, rather than on other terms that participants might accept. He also disputes the inference from the claim that natural talents are morally arbitrary to the conclusion that the benefits arising from those talents should be treated as a collective asset.

Specifically, Nozick attacks John Rawls's Difference Principle on the ground that the well-off could threaten a lack of social cooperation to the worse-off, just as Rawls implies that the worse-off will be assisted by the well-off for the sake of social cooperation. Nozick asks why the well-off would be obliged, due to their inequality and for the sake of social cooperation, to assist the worse-off and not have the worse-off accept the inequality and benefit the well-off. Furthermore, Rawls's idea regarding morally arbitrary natural endowments comes under fire; Nozick argues that natural advantages that the well-off enjoy do not violate anyone's rights and that, therefore, the well-off have a right to them. He also states that Rawls's proposal that inequalities be geared toward assisting the worse-off is morally arbitrary in itself.

== Economic theory ==
=== Wilt Chamberlain experiment ===
Nozick's famous Wilt Chamberlain argument is an attempt to show that patterned principles of just distribution are incompatible with liberty. He asks us to assume that the original distribution in society, D1, is ordered by our choice of patterned principle, for instance Rawls's Difference Principle. Wilt Chamberlain is an extremely popular basketball player in this society, and Nozick further assumes 1 million people are willing to freely give Chamberlain 25 cents each to watch him play basketball over the course of a season (we assume no other transactions occur). Chamberlain now has $250,000, a much larger sum than any of the other people in the society. This new distribution in society, call it D2, obviously is no longer ordered by our favored pattern that ordered D1. However Nozick argues that D2 is just. For if each agent freely exchanges some of his D1 share with the basketball player and D1 was a just distribution (we know D1 was just, because it was ordered according to the favored patterned principle of distribution), how can D2 fail to be a just distribution? Thus Nozick argues that what the Wilt Chamberlain example shows is that no patterned principle of just distribution will be compatible with liberty. In order to preserve the pattern, which arranged D1, the state will have to continually interfere with people's ability to freely exchange their D1 shares, for any exchange of D1 shares explicitly involves violating the pattern that originally ordered it.

=== Game theory ===
In Part III, Nozick describes a framework in which people may leave associations and form alternatives. A stable association is one from which no coalition can withdraw and make all of its members better off. He relates this condition to the core of a game and to competitive-market models, while noting that results from the simpler economic models cannot be transferred directly to his possible-worlds model.

=== Free rider problem ===
Nozick rejects the claim that accepting benefits from an unsolicited cooperative practice is by itself sufficient to create an enforceable obligation to participate. He illustrates the objection with a neighborhood public-address system: residents cannot impose a duty on another resident merely by providing entertainment that the resident sometimes hears.

For example, an independent may be using a method that does not impose a high risk on others but, if similar procedures are used by many others the total risk may go beyond an acceptable threshold. In that case it is impossible to decide who should stop doing it, since nobody is personally responsible and therefore nobody has a right to stop him. Independents may get together to decide these questions, but even if they agree to a mechanism to keep the total risk below the threshold, each individual will have an incentive to get out of the deal. This procedure fails because of the rationality of being a free rider on such grouping, taking advantage of everyone else's restraint and going ahead with one's own risky activities.

In a famous discussion he rejects H. L. A. Hart's "principle of fairness" for dealing with free riders, which would morally bind them to cooperative practices from which they benefit, as one may not charge and collect for benefits one bestows without prior agreement. Nozick refutes this in reference to procedural rights. Nozick assumes that we all have a right to know that we are being applied a fair and reliable method for deciding if we are guilty. If this information is not available publicly, we have a right to resist. We may also do it if we find this procedure unreliable or unfair after considering the information given. We may not even participate in the process, even if it would be advisable to do so.

The application of these rights may be delegated to the protective agency, which will prevent others from applying methods of which it finds unacceptable in terms of reliability or fairness. Presumably, it would publish a list of accepted methods. Anyone who violates this prohibition will be punished. Every individual has a right to do this, and other companies could try to enter the business, but the dominant protective agency is the only one that has the power to actually carry out this prohibition. It is the only one that can guarantee its clients that no unaccepted procedure will be applied to them.

=== Demoktesis ===
In the demoktesis thought experiment, people sell shares in rights over themselves. Through a sequence of voluntary transactions and consolidations, each person eventually holds an equal share in rights over every other person. Nozick presents the resulting system—"ownership of the people, by the people, and for the people"—as recognizable as a modern democratic state.

== Legal theory ==
=== Property ===
Nozick's entitlement theory treats holdings as the result of acquisition and voluntary transfer rather than as a pool awaiting distribution according to a preferred pattern. Nozick summarizes the theory, with qualifications, as "From each as they choose, to each as they are chosen."

==== Lockean proviso ====
Nozick interprets Locke's labor theory of property for original appropriation in a novel way, coining the term Lockean proviso. First, he considers some preliminary objections and explores the problems that may arise from it. He rebuts a simple labor-mixing account of original appropriation with the analogy of pouring tomato juice into the sea. Then, he "adds an additional bit of complexity" to the structure of the entitlement theory by refining Locke's proviso that "enough and as good" must be left in common for others by one's taking property in an unowned object. Nozick thus favours the "Lockean proviso" that forbids appropriation when the position of others is thereby worsened. For instance, appropriating the only water hole in a desert and charging monopoly prices would not be legitimate.

==== Inheritance ====
Nozick includes inheritance, gifts, charity, and bequests among transfers that can form part of an entitlement system without producing a patterned distribution. He treats bequests to children as transfers within that system rather than as a separate distributive pattern.

=== Crime ===
Nozick also outlines a theory of why some boundary crossings should be prohibited rather than permitted, but subject to compensation. Provided a victim has taken reasonable precautions to avoid the situation, Nozick defines compensation as anything that makes the victim indifferent, that is, they are just as good in their own judgement before the transgression and after the compensation. Nonetheless, he argues that, where boundaries are crossed, compensation is not enough. For one, some people will still violate these boundaries, thus requiring a means of deterrence.

Nozick models the decision making process of a potential criminal as an equation:

$G \cdot (1-p)>(C+D+E) \cdot p$, where

- G are the gains from violating the victim's rights
- p is the probability of getting caught
- (C + D + E) are the costs that the infractor would face if caught:
  - C is full compensation to the victim
  - D are all the emotional costs that the infractor would face if caught (by being apprehended, placed on trial and so on)
  - E are the financial costs of the processes of apprehension and trial

Where the above inequality holds, then the expected gains exceeds the expected losses, and there is no deterrent effect. Thus, it is necessary, according to Nozick, to increase the expected losses. Nozick considers two approaches to this issue: retribution (i.e. having the costs be proportionate to the harm) and deterrence (i.e. having the costs be proportionate to the gains). Nozick regards the deterrent approach as untenable and prefers the retributive approach.

Under this approach, an additional cost R should be imposed to the transgressor that is proportional to the harm done, where:

- $R = r\cdot H \qquad 0 \leq r \leq 1$, and
- r is the degree of responsibility the infractor has, and
- H is the amount of harm.

Hence, by adding R, it is hoped that the inequality becomes:

$G\cdot (1 - p) < (C+D+E+R) \cdot p$

Under the retributive theory, Nozick also contends that self-defense is appropriate even if the victim uses more force to defend themself. In particular, he proposes that the maximum amount of force that a potential victim can use is:

$F \leq f(H) + r \cdot H ~~~~~(f(H) \geq H )$

Here, H is the harm that the victim thinks that the other is going to inflict, and f(H) is some function of H that Nozick does not define. If the victim uses more force than f(H), that additional force is to be subtracted later from the punishment that the felon gets.

=== Compensation ===
After discussing the issue of punishment, and noting that not all violations of rights will be deterred under a retributive theory of justice, Nozick addresses the issue of compensation and wrongdoing, specifically, whether anyone can do anything to anyone and simply pay them afterwards as compensation.

First, he argues that if some person (A) gets a big gain by violating another's (B) rights, and A has to compensate B up to B's point of indifference, A nonetheless gets all the benefits of the violation. He also notes that, if a market-based approach were to be adopted, where the buyer does not necessarily just pay up to the point where the seller is indifferent, but where the payment may go beyond the indifference point, there is an issue of determination of what a fair price is. According to Nozick's view of economic theory, a fair price can only be determined via bargaining, and thus it would be inapposite for A to violate B's rights without B's consent, as the compensation would likely be unfair.

Second, Nozick argues that even if one knows they will be compensated if their rights are violated, they will still fear this violation, and allowing anything if compensation is paid will make all people fearful. Nozick argues that the creation of a general fear cannot be allowed, because of intractable issues relating to the compensation of the causing of fear, as well as on the Kantian principle of treating people as ends rather than means.

Despite these two arguments, Nozick does not believe in prohibiting all boundary crossing that isn't consented in advance, as he observes that people may cross some boundaries by accident, and that the costs of getting that consent may be too high, for example, if the B is in the jungle. Thus, Nozick's conclusion is that, "The most efficient policy forgoes the fewest net beneficial acts; it allows anyone to perform an unfeared action without prior agreement, provided the transaction costs of reaching a prior agreement are greater, even by a bit, than the costs of the posterior compensation process."

Rothbard has criticised this view, arguing that compensation is always simply a method of trying to recompense the victim after a crime occurs, and it can never justify the initial violation of individual rights.

==== Risk and unintentional wrongs ====
Nozick's compensation principle holds that a legal system must prohibit specially dangerous actions that are generally done, and the law must also provide for the compensation of the individual who is specially disadvantaged from the prohibition. For example, it is allowed to forbid epileptics from driving, but only if they are compensated exactly for the costs that they has to assume (e.g. by way of hiring chauffeurs, taxis). Such a principle would only hold if the benefit from the increased security outweighs these costs. At the same time, the compensation awarded to these individuals must be exact and cannot be negotiated, as, ultimately, it is not right to pay a person or group to prevent him from doing something that otherwise would give him no benefit whatsoever, such transactions being essentially "unproductive activities".

Nozick notes that, although a particular action may not cause fear if it has a low probability of causing harm, when all possible risky activities are added up, the probability of being harmed may be high. This poses the problem that prohibiting all such activities may be too restrictive. Nozick provides a solution in the form of a threshold value V such that there is a violation of rights if $p \cdot H \geq V$ (where p is the probability of harming and H is the amount of harm that could be done). Although insurance solutions may work in some of these cases, some persons will not have the means to buy insurance or compensate other people for the risks of their actions. The principle of compensation, nonetheless, should not apply liberally, as "an enormous number of actions do increase risk to others", and "a society which prohibited such uncovered actions would ill fit a picture of a free society as one embodying a presumption in favor of liberty, under which people permissibly could perform actions so long as they didn't harm others in specified ways". Thus, to Nozick "to prohibit risky acts (because they are financially uncovered or because they are too risky) limits individual's freedom to act, even though the actions actually might involve no cost at all to anyone else."

Rothbard has criticised Nozick's risk and compensation principles as fallacious and liable to result in unlimited despotism.

== Reception ==
Critics of Nozick's framework for utopia have questioned whether formal freedom to leave a community is sufficient when disability, poverty, or other circumstances restrict a person's practical options. David Schaefer argued that Nozick's allowance for voluntary enslavement creates tension with the framework's reliance on freedom of movement and choice.

== Influence ==
Political theorist Joseph Carens, for example, has argued that Nozick’s libertarianism lends support to an immigration policy of open borders. Similarly, philosopher Andy Lamey has argued that it provides a surprising degree of support for a system of indigenous rights similar to that proposed by Will Kymlicka and other liberal defenders of minority rights.

== See also ==
- American philosophy
- Constitutional economics
- Liberalism and the Limits of Justice
- Rule according to higher law
