= Erhard Blankenburg =

Erhard Blankenburg (October 30, 1938 – March 28, 2018) was a German sociologist, specializing in the sociology of law.

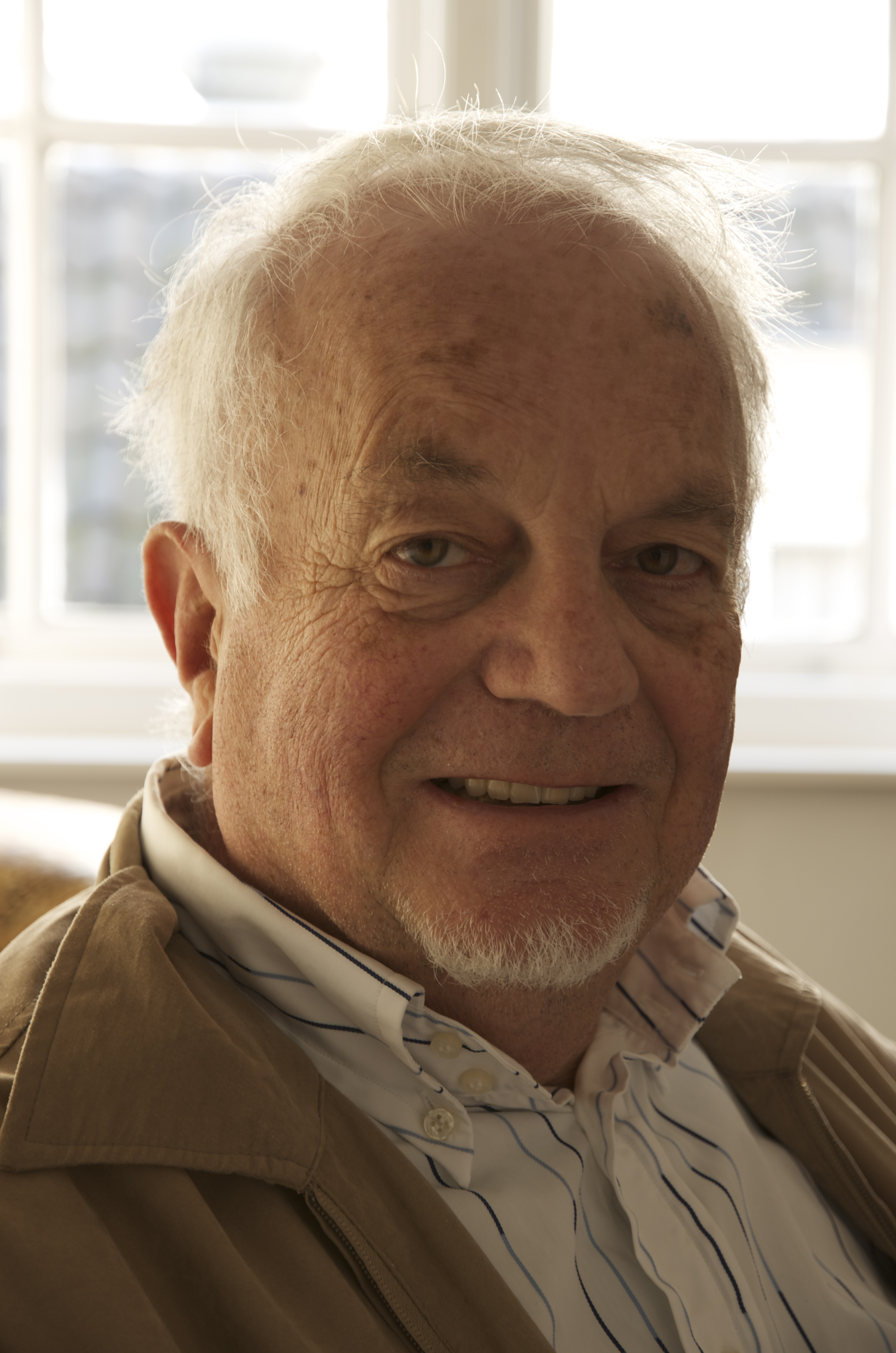
Erhard Blankenburg (2013)

== Education and career ==
Blankenburg studied philosophy, sociology and German literature at the University of Freiburg and the Free University Berlin. He received an MA from the University of Oregon (1965) and a PhD (D.Phil.) from the University of Basel (1966). After working as an assistant to the sociologist Heinrich Popitz at the University of Freiburg (1966-1968), he received there his habilitation (1974). From 1975 to 1980, Blankenburg worked at the renowned Wissenschaftszentrums Berlin. In 1980 he became professor of sociology of law at the Free University Amsterdam

In the 1970s, he was, along with Wolfgang Kaupen, Rüdiger Lautmann and Volkmar Gessner, instrumental in reviving sociology of law in Germany. There, he was among the founders of the "Zeitschrift für Rechtssoziologie", still the leading journal in the German socio-legal community. He also played a role in establishing the International Institute for the Sociology of Law. In 1991, together with Bill Felstiner, he organized the first joint meeting of the Law and Society Association and the Research Committee on Sociology of Law, the two leading organizations of socio-legal scholars in Amsterdam. His research covered a broad range of socio-legal topics, with an interest in describing and comparing legal cultures at the centre.

In 2005, Blankenburg received, at the annual conference of the Research Committee on Sociology of Law in Paris, the Adam Podgórecki Prize "for outstanding achievements in socio-legal research". "Blankenburg has given us an important body of work. It is work that is (and should be) extremely influential in the field; and no respectable sociologist of law can afford to ignore it. For this he deserves out thanks and our congratulation" (Friedman 1998, 386).

== Selected publications ==
- Erhard Blankenburg/Johannes Feest (1972): Die Definitionsmacht der Polizei. Strategien der Strafverfolgung und soziale Selektion. Düsseldorf: Bertelsmann Universitätsverlag.
- Erhard Blankenburg, ed., 1975)):Empirische Rechtssoziologie. Pieper: München.
- Erhard Blankenburg et al. (1978): Die Staatsanwaltschaft im Prozess strafrechtlicher Sozialkontrolle. Berlin: Duncker & Humblot:
- Erhard Blankenburg: The poverty of evolutionism. In: Law & Society Review 18 (1984), 273-290.
- Erhard Blankenburg, ed. (1988): Prozessflut - Indikatorenvergleich von Rechtskulturen auf dem europäischen Kontinent. Köln: Bundesanzeiger.
- Erhard Blankenburg et al. (1991): Neue Wege im Zivilverfahren. Köln: Bundesanzeiger.
- Erhard Blankenburg/Freek Bruinsma (1991): Dutch Legal Culture. Deventer: Kluwer.
- Erhard Blankenburg (1995): Mobilisierung des Rechts - Eine Einführung in die Rechtssoziologie.Heidelberg: Springer.
- Erhard Blankenburg (1999): Legal Culture on Every Conceptual Level. In: Johannes Feest (ed.) Globalization and Legal Cultures. Onati Summer Course 1997, 11-19.
- Erhard Blankenburg (2000): Legal Culture in Five Central European Countries. Den Haag: WRR.
- Erhard Blankenburg (2011): Failures of war tribunals : from Leipzig, Nuremberg, and Tokyo to Milosevic and Saddam Hussein. 2011. In: Robert W. Gordon and Morton J. Horwitz (eds.): Law, society and history: themes in the legal sociology and legal history of Lawrence M. Friedman. Cambridge; New York : Cambridge University Press, 137-145.
- Erhard Blankenburg (2014): "Push and pull of judicial demand and supply." In: Michele and Henrik Schmiegelow (eds.) Institutional competition between common law and civil law: theory and policy. Springer: Heidelberg, 299-322.
- Erhard Blankenburg (2016): "Mobilization of the German Federal Constitutional Court." In: Ralf Rogowski and Thomas Gawron (eds.). Constitutional Court in Comparison: The US Supreme Court and the German Federal Constitutional Court. Berghahn: New York/Oxford, 92-108.
