= Leon Petrażycki =

Polish philosopher, legal scholar, and sociologist

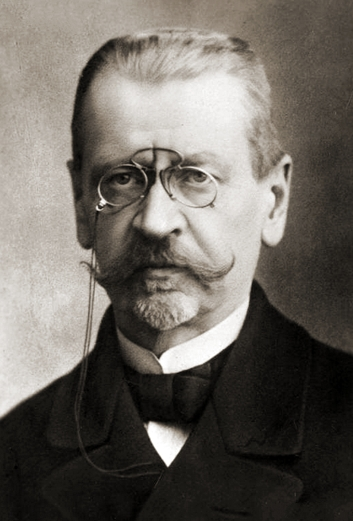
- Born: 13 April 1867; Kołłątajewo, Sennensky Uyezd, Mogilev Governorate, Russian Empire
- Died: 15 May 1931 (Aged 64); Warsaw, Poland
- Resting place: Powązki Cemetery

Philosophical work
- Main interests: Philosophy of law, Sociology of law
- Notable ideas: Psychological theory of law

Leon Petrażycki (Polish: Leon Petrażycki; Russian: Лев Ио́сифович Петражи́цкий, romanized: Lev Iosifovich Petrazhitsky; 13 April 1867 – 15 May 1931) was a Russian and Polish philosopher, legal scholar, and sociologist, deputy of the first State Duma of Russian Empire. He is considered an important forerunner of the sociology of law and the founder of St. Petersburg School of Philosophy of Law.

== Life ==
Leon Petrażycki was born into the Polish gentry of the Mogilev Governorate in the Russian Empire. In 1890 he graduated from Kiev University, then spent two years on a scholarship in Berlin, and in 1896 received a doctorate from the University of St. Petersburg. At the latter university, he served from 1897 to 1917 as a professor of the philosophy of law.

In 1906 Petrażycki was elected to the ill-fated First Duma as a member of the Constitutional Democratic Party. When the legislature was dissolved after a few months, he was convicted and incarcerated for his protests. He was appointed to the Supreme Court of Russia in 1917, but had to flee the country when the Bolshevik revolution succeeded. He found a new home in Poland and became the first professor of sociology at Warsaw University in 1919.

A prolific writer in several languages and famous lecturer with a large following of students, Petrażycki committed suicide in 1931. However, Petrażycki's contribution to legal sociology and legal theory continues to be debated within various fields of legal research and applied to the study of current legal questions.

== Work ==
Petrażycki published many books in Russian, German, and Polish early in life. Unfortunately, many of his late ideas were preserved only in lecture notes taken by his students. Even in Poland, his work is only partly known.

English speakers still largely rely on a compilation of Petrażycki's writings edited by the Russian-American sociologist Nicholas S. Timasheff in 1955. Despite some recent efforts to introduce and revive his work, it is still largely unknown in the West.

Petrażycki conceives of law as an empirical, psychological phenomenon that can best be studied by introspection. According to him, law takes the form of legal experiences (emotions, impulsions) implying a two-sided relationship between a right on the one hand and a duty on the other hand. If this legal experience refers to normative facts in a broad sense (statutes, court decisions, but also contracts, customs, commands of any sort) he calls it "positive law"; if it lacks such reference, he talks of "intuitive law".

In another conceptualization, he contrasts "official law" (made by the state and its agents) to "unofficial law" (made by societal agents), which brings him close to legal pluralism. He parallels Eugen Ehrlich´s idea of living law when he states that "the true practice of civil law or any law is not to be found in the courts, but altogether elsewhere. Its practitioners are not judges and advocates, but each individual citizen..." (Petrażycki 1897, as quoted by Motyka)

Petrażycki's theory of law is anti-statist and very critical of the legal positivism of his time, which he takes to task for being naive and lacking a truly scientific basis because of its focus on norms, rather than the experience of those norms. He also rejects the rather common notion that only human beings can have rights and can therefore be seen as an early proponent of animal rights.

Petrażycki has been called the "unrecognized father of the sociology of law" (Adam Podgorecki 1980/81). His influence on the sociology of law has been primarily indirect through some of his students, specifically Nicholas S. Timasheff, Georges Gurvitch, and Pitirim Sorokin, who each in various ways contributed to formulate a more distinctly sociological perspective, derived from and complementary to Petrażycki's psychological theory.

== See also ==
- History of philosophy in Poland
- International Institute for the Sociology of Law
- List of Poles
- Sociology in Poland
- Sociology of law
- Michał Weinzieher

== Notes ==
Political offices
Preceded by 1905 Revolution	Member of the First Duma; 1906 - 1907	Succeeded by Second Duma
Preceded by February Revolution	Justice of the Supreme Court of Russia; 1917	Succeeded by October Revolution
