= Jiří Přibáň =

Czech lawyer

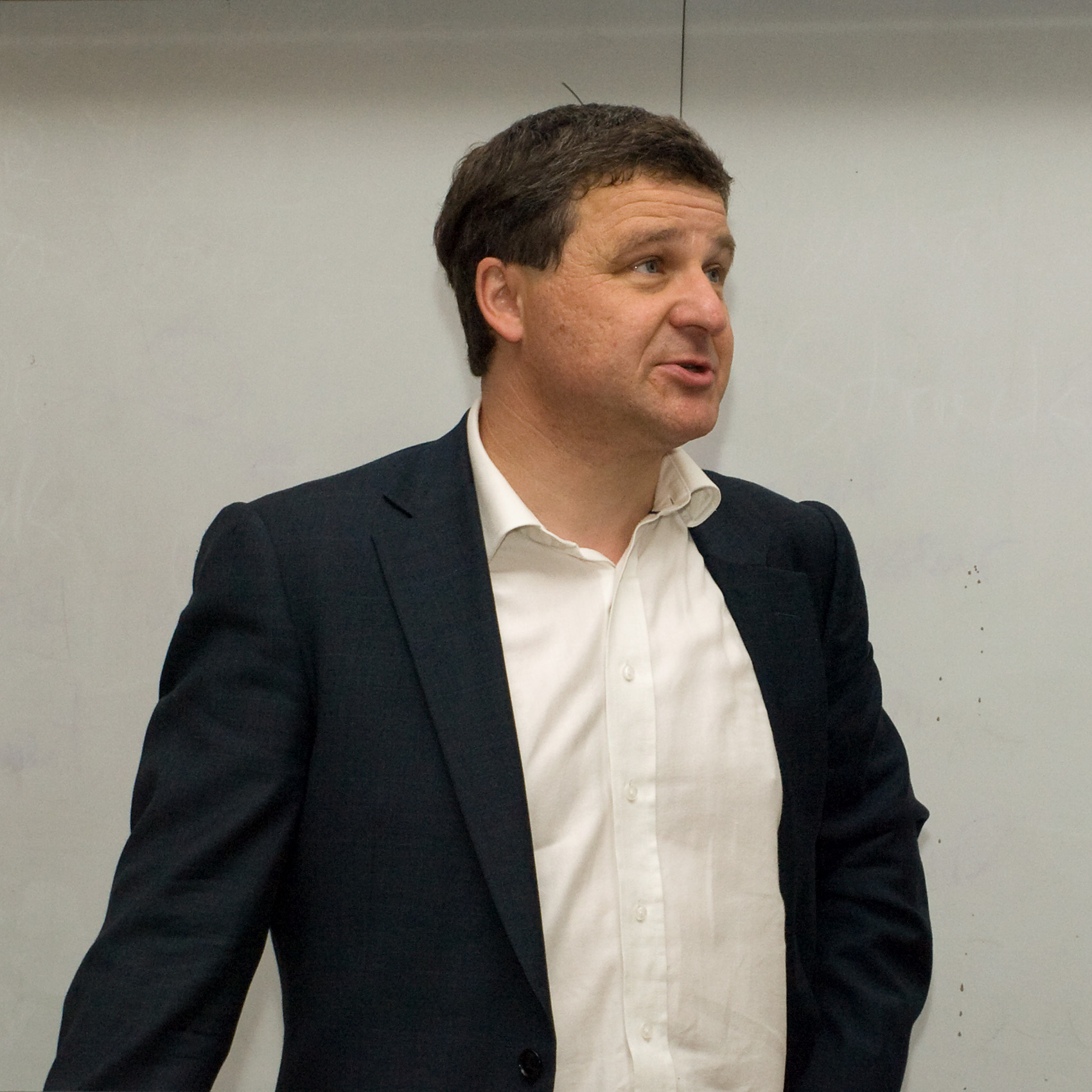
Jiří Přibáň at A Night of Philosophy in Prague (2016)

Jiří Přibáň (born 25 August 1967) is a Czech-British academic, author, translator and essayist. He was appointed as a justice of the Constitutional Court of the Czech Republic on 25 June 2024. He specialises in sociology of law, jurisprudence, legal theory and philosophy of law, and was awarded professorship in the discipline by Charles University in Prague in 2002.

== Biography ==
Jiří Přibáň was born on 25 August 1967 in Prague. He comes from Odolena Voda. He attended the Dvořák High School in Kralupy nad Vltavou and then the Faculty of Law of Charles University (1985–1989). In 1990, he joined the faculty as an assistant, eventually earning his associate professorship in 1997, Doctor of Sciences degree in 2001, and full professorship in the fields of legal theory, philosophy, and sociology in 2002. He is a member of the Learned Society of the Czech Republic, Academy of Social Sciences, and Academia Europaea. In 2022, he was awarded the Silver Medal of Antonín Randa by the Union of Czech Lawyers.

Since 1993, Přibáň regularly visited Cardiff University, where he became a member of the editorial board of the Journal of Law and Society. Over time, he engaged in both research and teaching at Cardiff School of Law and Politics, achieving professorship there in 2006. In 2014, he co-founded the Centre of Law and Society at Cardiff University, which he led until his appointment as a Justice of the Constitutional Court.

Přibáň authored dozens of books and hundreds of studies, including Sázka na svobodu [The Freedom Gamble] (2024), Obrana ústavnosti [The Defence of Constitutionalism] (2014), and a trilogy of dialogues with journalist Karel Hvížďala: Hledání dějin (2018), Hledání odpovědnosti (2021) a Hledání smyslu (2013) [In Quest of History; In Quest of Responsibility; and In Quest of Meaning]. In English, his notable works include a trilogy of monographs on constitutional semantics: Legal Symbolism (2007), Sovereignty in Post-Sovereign Society (2015), and Constitutional Imaginaries (2022), as well as Dissidents of Law (2002), which explores political dissent in communist regimes and its theoretical and philosophical significance.

Prof. Přibáň has served as a visiting professor or research fellow at a number of academic institutions around the world, such as the University of California, Berkeley; New York University; the University of New South Wales in Sydney; the University of Pretoria; the University of San Francisco; the European University Institute in Fiesole; and the Royal Flemish Academy of Belgium for Science and the Arts in Brussels. His scientific work has earned him several awards, including The Socio-Legal Theory and History Book Prize from theSocio-Legal Studies Association.

As an independent expert, he has prepared various studies and reports for constitutional and international institutions, such as the House of Lords of the UK Parliament or the United Nations.

Besides his academic work, Prof. Přibáň engages in journalism. During his student years, he actively contributed to the creation and operation of independent student periodicals. He regularly contributes to Czech and international media, writing essays on art and culture. These are collected in books Pod čarou umění (2008) and Pictures of Czech Postmodernism (2013). His Italian travels inspired the 2020 book of essays Italské črty [Italian Sketches], illustrated by painter Jakub Špaňhel.

On 25 June 2024, the President of the Czech Republic Petr Pavel appointed him a Justice of the Constitutional Court.

== Selected monographs ==
- Přibáň, J. 2002. Dissidents of law: on the 1989 velvet revolutions, legitimations, fictions of legality and contemporary version of the social contract. Law, Justice and Power. London: Routledge.
- Přibáň, J. 2007. Legal symbolism: on law, time and European identity. Applied Legal Philosophy. London: Routledge.
- Přibáň, J. 2013. Pictures of Czech Postmodernism. Prague: KANT Publishing.
- Přibáň, J. 2015. Sovereignty in Post-Sovereign Society: A systems theory of European constitutionalism. Applied Legal Philosophy. London: Routledge.
- Přibáň, J., Schwartz, G. and Severo Rocha, L. 2015. Sociologia sistemico-autopoietica das constituicoes [A Sociology of Autopoietic Systems of Constitutions] Livraria Do Advogado Editora [in Portuguese].
- Přibáň, J. 2017. The Defence of Constitutionalism. Prague/Chicago: Karolinum Press/University of Chicago Press.
- Přibáň, J. 2019. In Quest of History: on Czech Statehood and Identity. Prague/Chicago: Karolinum Press/University of Chicago Press.
- Přibáň, J. 2022. Constitutional Imaginaries: A Theory of European Societal Constitutionalism. London: Routledge.
