= Gloria Amparo Rodriguez =

Colombian legal scholar and environmentalist

Gloria Amparo Rodríguez
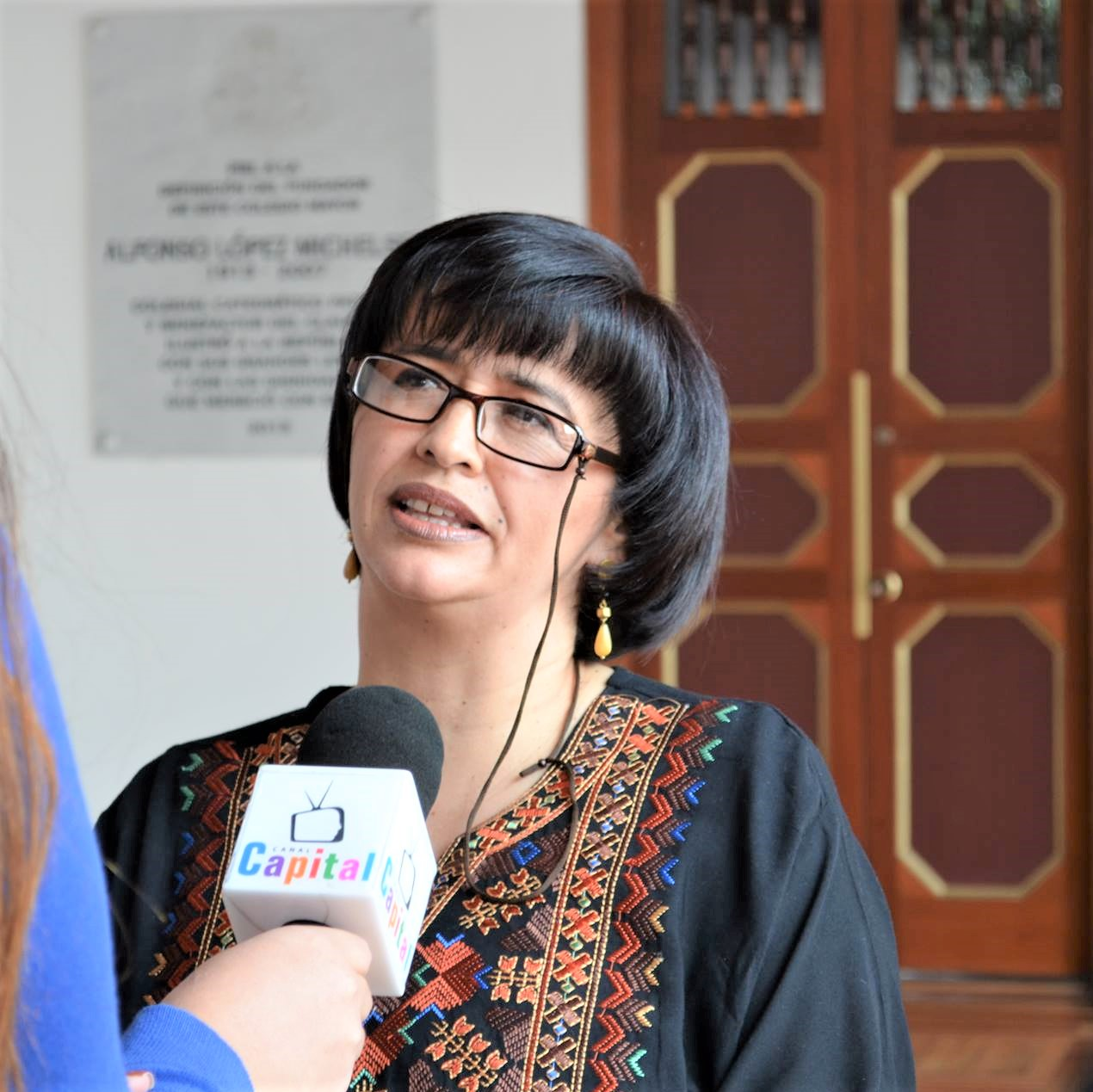
- Born: August 21, 1962; Pensilvania, Caldas; Colombia
- Citizenship: Colombian
- Education: Ph.D. in Sociology of Law, Universidad Externado de Colombia
- Known for: Prior Consultation – Contemporary Theory
- Scientific career
- Fields: Environmental Law & Rights of indigenous peoples of Colombia
- Institutions: Bogotá

Gloria Amparo Rodríguez (born 21 August 1963, Pensilvania, Caldas, Colombia) is a Colombian legal scholar and environmentalist. Rodríguez is currently director and professor of law at the Public Law Research Group at Universidad del Rosario, a senior fellow at the International Institute for the Sociology of Law, and adjunct judge of the Constitutional Court of Colombia.

Her theory on the protection of the rights of indigenous peoples, in which their interests are enforced through the previous, free and informed consense, is one of the most influential contemporary theories on prior consultation in Colombia and Latin America. Rodriguez argues for a "comprehensive reading" of the consent in activities that may affect the rights of indigenous peoples, and an interpretive approach to information and freedom in decision-making.

Gloria Rodríguez has served in many academic and public organizations, and received her Ph.D. in Sociology of Law from the Universidad Externado de Colombia. The 'Masaji Chiba' Postdoctoral Fellowship at IISJ in Oñati, allowed her placed emphasis on the study of the development of the complex socio-political ethnic groups. In 2009 Gloria Rodríguez received an honorary postgraduate degree from Rosario University. In 2011, G.A.R. was awarded a "Premio de Docencia Juan Agustín Uricoechea y Navarro”.

In 2004, Rodríguez created the "Cátedra Viva Intercultural" sponsored by the Government of Colombia, throuht the Ministry of Education. She has also conducted an extensive list of projects on environmental issues and Human Rights, restoring the ecological function of property in indigenous reserves. She is one of the most cited law experts in Colombia., due to the reception of its theoretical postulates, especially one in which proposed rulemaking to conserve, restore and protect the Colombian medicinal plants and associated traditional knowledge, in order to promote disclosure mechanisms for the preservation of cultural and biological diversity in Colombia.

== See also ==
- Indigenous Rights
- Natural and legal rights
- Sociology of Law
