= UAB Institute of Law and Technology =

Spanish research centre

- Type: Public
- Industry: Law and technology research
- Founded: Bellaterra, Barcelona (January 27, 2005)
- Headquarters: Bellaterra, Barcelona, Spain
- Area served: Worldwide
- Key people: Pompeu Casanovas (Founder); Marta Poblet (CEO); Jorge Gonzalez-Conejero (CTO)
- Number of employees: 40
- Website: IDT-UAB

The UAB Institute of Law and Technology (IDT), housed at the Faculty of Law of the Universitat Autonoma de Barcelona, is a research center promoting research on law and technology from an interdisciplinary perspective. The IDT was created in 2005 and emerged from the former UAB Sociolegal Studies Group (GRES). The former GRES began its research activities in 1992 with the aim to foster social sciences research and methodologies in the law domain. In this line, the GRES set up a Laboratory of Analysis of Qualitative and Audio-Visual Data, which is nowadays integrated within the IDT (IDT-Lab) and continues to develop methods for data analysis, incorporating new multimedia technologies. The research group trained a number of graduate students on the areas of legal culture and judicial studies, and three of them obtained Fulbright Scholarships to complete their PhDs in North American institutions. The GRES was connected from its foundation to other international research organizations (i.e. by becoming Groupement de Recherche 1036 of the French CNRS) and institutions (International Institute for the Sociology of Law) and participated actively in international conferences (Law and Society Association, Research Committee on Sociology of Law, International Sociological Association, etc.).

At present, the areas of research include artificial intelligence and law, legal culture and judicial studies, alternative dispute resolution (ADR) and online dispute resolution (ODR), the Semantic Web, and cultural and legal ontologies.

The foundation of the IDT in 2005 represented a step further in different ways. First, the institute was officially established as a UAB research center within the Department of Political Science and Public Law. Its permanent staff was enlarged and it attracted researchers from other law departments (international law, criminal law, and commercial law), from institutions on the UAB campus (Artificial Intelligence Research Institute (IIIA-CSIC)), from the UPC, the CNRS, and from technology companies (iSOCO, S21sec). Second, the IDT-UAB devoted a major research effort on law and technology related issues, becoming a partner of large EU Projects and of industrial Spanish Projects. Third, the IDT became a member of the international network of institutions, associations, and research groups working on law and technology (International Association for Artificial Intelligence and Law, JURIX, Free Access to Law Movement, etc.). As a result, the IDT has established solid relations with other International Law and Technology Institutes: i.e., Cornell Legal Information Institute (LLI), Tilburg Institute for Law, Technology and Society (TILT), Institute of Legal Information Theory and Techniques (ITTIG-CNR), Centre of Electronic Dispute Resolution (University of Amsterdam), Haifa Center of Law & Technology (HCLT).

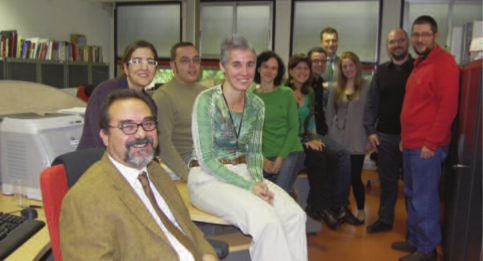

At present, the IDT has 40 members from different domains (law, political sciences, sociology, computer sciences, knowledge engineering) and more than 100 publications in national and international peer-reviewed publications in the law, artificial intelligence, Semantic Web, knowledge management, mediation, and online dispute resolution domains. The IDT has participated from 2005 to 2011 in 36 national and EU competitive research projects. The research and the outreach activities of the IDT have been featured in different mainstream media.
