= Sociology of law =

Sub-discipline of sociology relating to legal studies

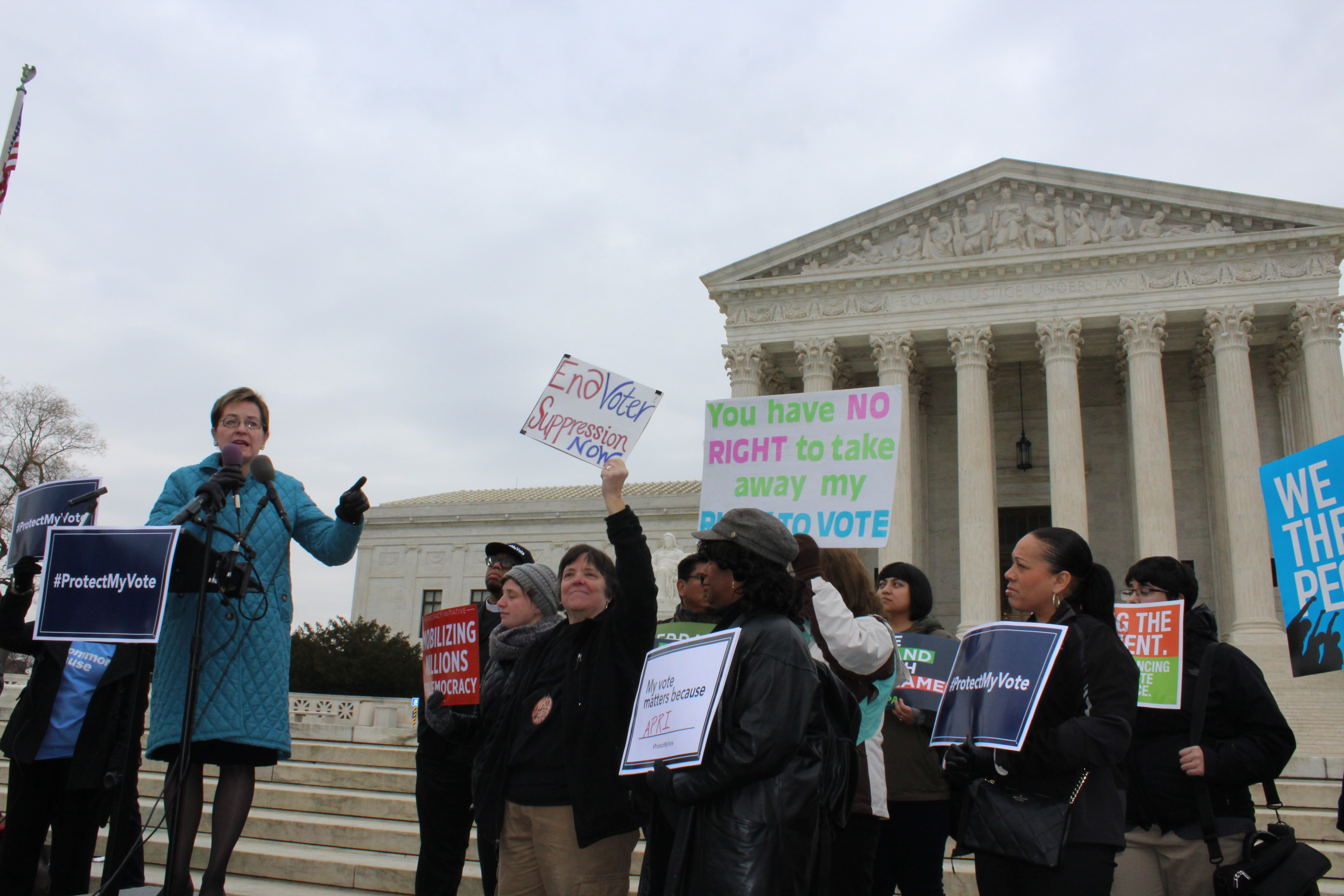
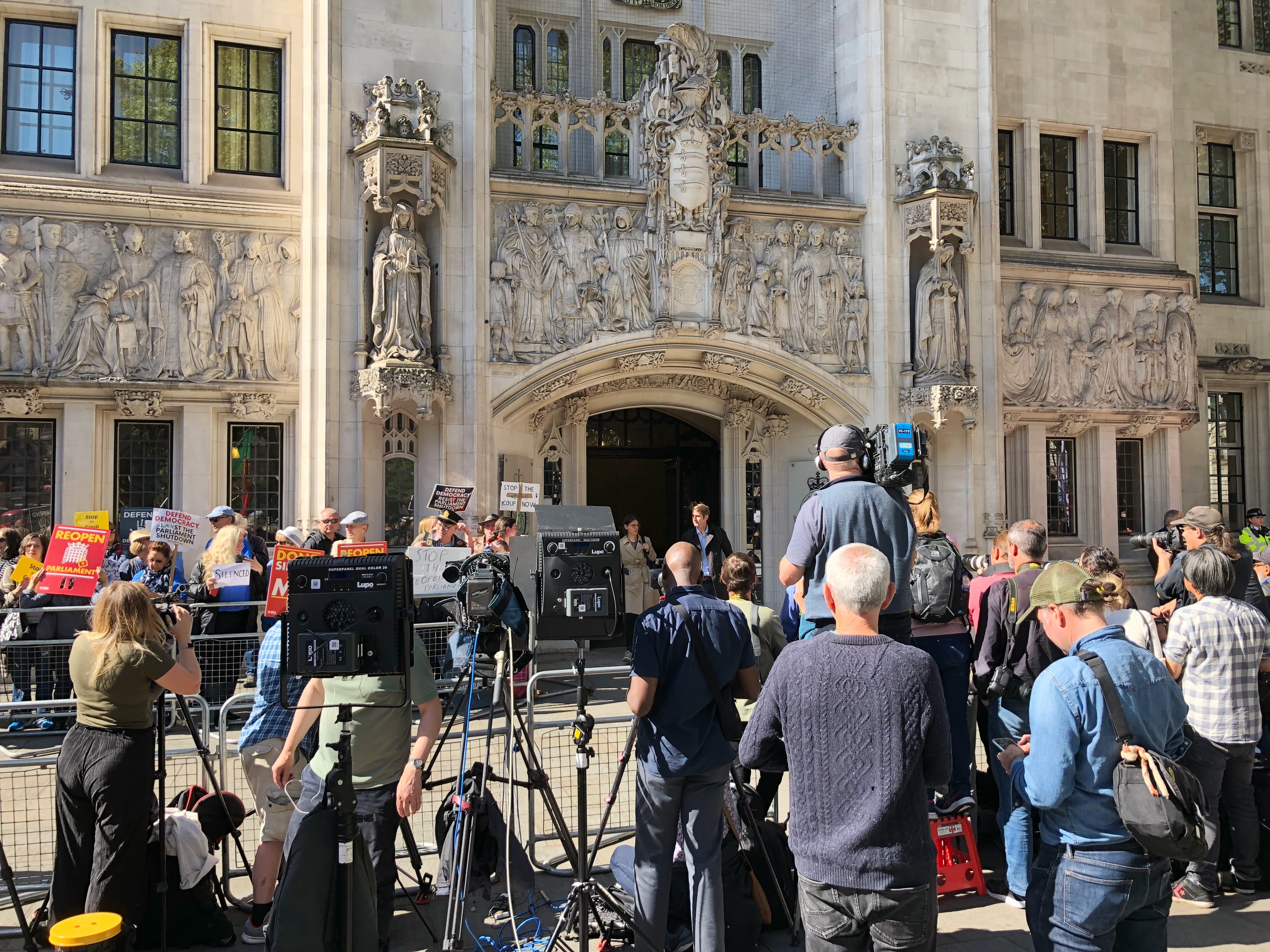
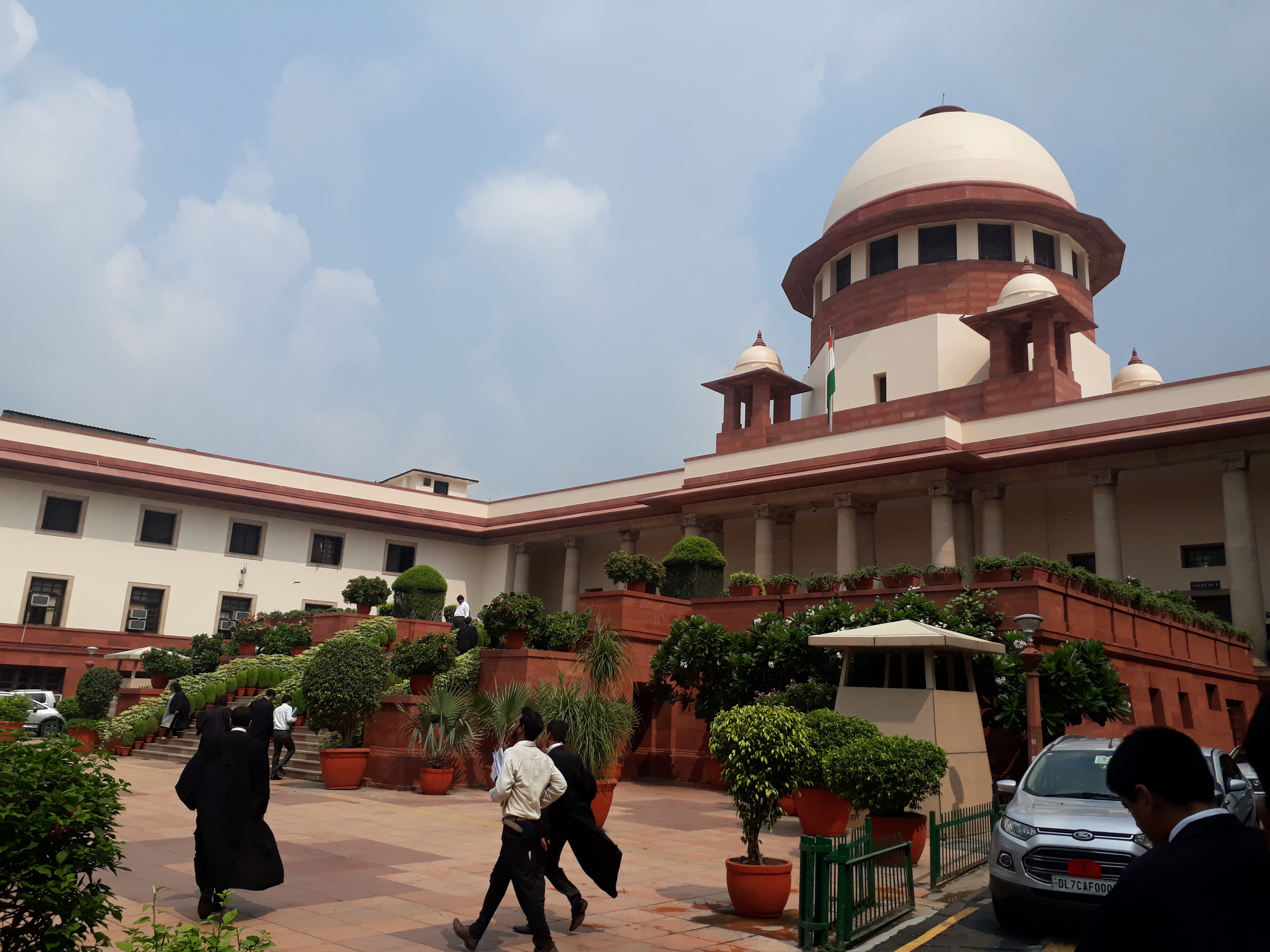
Legal systems and society. Top-left: Congresswoman Marcy Kaptur (D-OH), Dean of the Ohio Delegation, spoke at a press conference at the U.S. Supreme Court to defend voter rights in Ohio. Top-right: Protests and press outside the Supreme Court of the United Kingdom. Bottom-right: upclose image of the Supreme Court of India.

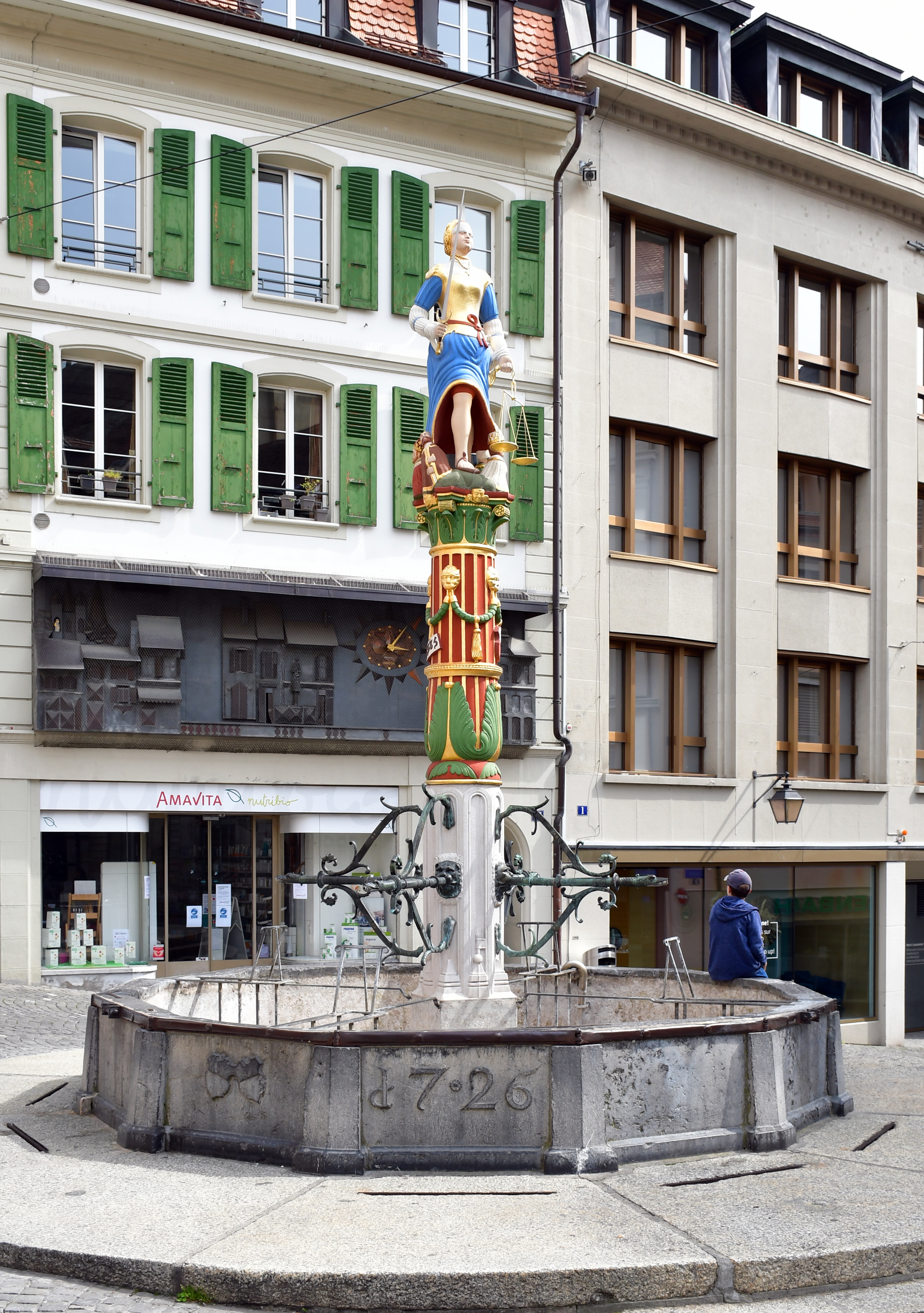
Fountain de la Justice which features the attributes of jurisprudence and justice. Switzerland.

The sociology of law, legal sociology, or law and society, is often described as a sub-discipline of sociology or an interdisciplinary approach within legal studies. Some see sociology of law as belonging "necessarily" to the field of sociology, but others tend to consider it a field of research caught up between the disciplines of law and sociology. Still others regard it as neither a subdiscipline of sociology nor a branch of legal studies but as a field of research on its own right within the broader social science tradition. Accordingly, it may be described without reference to mainstream sociology as "the systematic, theoretically grounded, empirical study of law as a set of social practices or as an aspect or field of social experience". It has been seen as treating law and justice as fundamental institutions of the basic structure of society mediating "between political and economic interests, between culture and the normative order of society, establishing and maintaining interdependence, and constituting themselves as sources of consensus, coercion and social control".

Irrespective of whether sociology of law is defined as a sub-discipline of sociology, an approach within legal studies or a field of research in its own right, it remains intellectually dependent mainly on the traditions, methods and theories of sociology proper, criminology, administration of justice, and processes that define the criminal justice system, as well as to a lesser extent, on other social sciences such as social anthropology, political science, social policy, psychology, and geography. As such, it reflects social theories and employs social scientific methods to study law, legal institutions and legal behavior. The sociological study of law, therefore, understands jurisprudence from differing perspectives. Those perspectives are analytical or positive, historical, and theoretical.

More specifically, sociology of law consists of various approaches to the study of law in society, which empirically examine and theorize the interaction between law, legal and non-legal institutions, and social factors. Areas of socio-legal inquiry include the social development of legal institutions, forms of social control, legal regulation, the interaction between legal cultures, the social construction of legal issues, the legal profession, and the relation between law and social change.

More than often sociology of law benefits from research conducted within other fields such as comparative law, critical legal studies, jurisprudence, legal theory, law and economics and law and literature. Its object and that of jurisprudence focused on institutional questions conditioned by social and political situations converge - for example, in the interdisciplinary dominions of criminology and of economic analysis of law - contributing to stretch out the power of legal norms but also making their impacts a matter of scientific concern.

== Intellectual origins ==
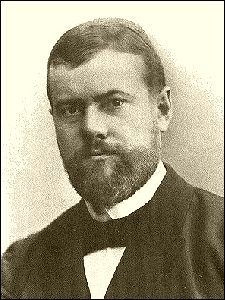
Max Weber

The roots of the sociology of law can be traced back to the works of sociologists and jurists of the turn of the previous century. The relationship between law and society was sociologically explored in the seminal works of both Max Weber and Émile Durkheim. The writings on law by these classical sociologists are foundational to the entire sociology of law today. A number of other scholars, mainly jurists, also employed social scientific theories and methods in an attempt to develop sociological theories of law. Notably among these were Leon Petrazycki, Eugen Ehrlich, and Georges Gurvitch.

For Max Weber, a so-called "legal rational form" as a type of domination within society, is not attributable to people but to abstract norms. He understood the body of coherent and calculable law in terms of a rational-legal authority. Such coherent and calculable law formed a precondition for modern political developments and the modern bureaucratic state and developed in parallel with the growth of capitalism. Central to the development of modern law is the formal rationalisation of law on the basis of general procedures that are applied equally and fairly to all. Modern rationalised law is also codified and impersonal in its application to specific cases. In general, Weber's standpoint can be described as an external approach to law that studies the empirical characteristics of law, as opposed to the internal perspective of the legal sciences and the moral approach of the philosophy of law.

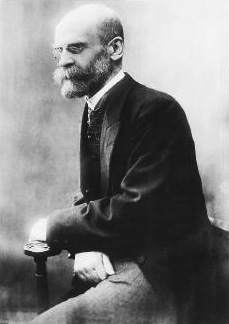
Émile Durkheim

Émile Durkheim wrote in The Division of Labour in Society that as society becomes more complex, the body of civil law concerned primarily with restitution and compensation grows at the expense of criminal laws and penal sanctions. Over time, law has undergone a transformation from repressive law to restitutive law. Restitutive law operates in societies in which there is a high degree of individual variation and emphasis on personal rights and responsibilities. For Durkheim, law is an indicator of the mode of integration of a society, which can be mechanical, among identical parts, or organic, among differentiated parts such as in industrialized societies. Durkheim also argued that a sociology of law should be developed alongside, and in close connection with, a sociology of morals, studying the development of value systems reflected in law.

In Fundamental Principles of the Sociology of Law, Eugen Ehrlich developed a sociological approach to the study of law by focusing on how social networks and groups organized social life. He explored the relationship between law and general social norms and distinguished between "positive law," consisting of the compulsive norms of state requiring official enforcement, and "living law," consisting of the rules of conduct that people in fact obeyed and which dominated social life. The latter emerged spontaneously as people interacted with each other to form social associations.

The centre of gravity of legal development therefore from time immemorial has not lain in the activity of the state, but in society itself, and must be sought there at the present time".

— Eugen Ehrlich, Fundamental Principles of the Sociology of Law

This was subjected to criticism by the advocates of legal positivism such as the jurist Hans Kelsen for its distinction between "law created by the state and law produced by the organisational imperatives of non-state social associations". According to Kelsen, Ehrlich had confused Sein ("is") and Sollen ("ought"). However, some argued that Ehrlich was distinguishing between positive (or state) law, which lawyers learn and apply, and other forms of 'law', what Ehrlich called "living law", that regulate everyday life, generally preventing conflicts from reaching lawyers and courts.

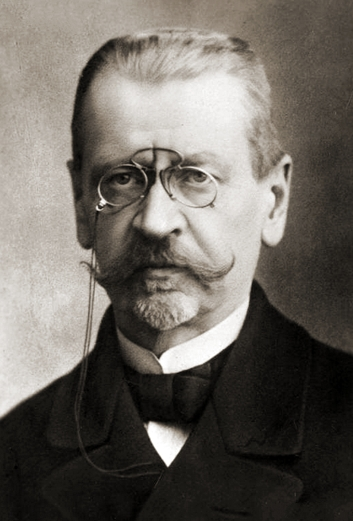
Leon Petrazycki

Leon Petrazycki distinguished between forms of "official law," supported by the state, and "intuitive law," consisting of legal experiences that, in turn, consist of a complex of psychic processes in the mind of the individual with no reference to outside authorities. Petrazycki's work addressed sociological problems and his method was empirical, since he maintained that one could gain knowledge of objects or relationships only by observation. However, he couched his theory in the language of cognitive psychology and moral philosophy rather than sociology. Consequently, his contribution to the development of sociology of law remains largely unrecognized. For example, Petrazycki's "intuitive law" influenced not only the development of Georges Gurvitch's concept of "social law" (see below), which in turn has left its mark on socio-legal theorising, but also the work of later socio-legal scholars. Among those who were directly inspired by Petrazycki's work is the Polish legal sociologist Adam Podgórecki.

Theodor Geiger developed a close-knit analysis of the Marxist theory of law. He highlighted how law becomes a "factor in social transformation in democratic societies of the kind that are governed by the consent expressed by universal suffrage of the population practised at regular intervals". Geiger went on to develop the salient characteristics of his antimetaphysical thinking, until he exceeded it with practical nihilism. Geiger's nihilism of values paved the way for a form of legal nihilism, which encourages the construction of a sober democracy "that is capable of raising conflict to the intellectual level and of anaesthetising feelings, as it is aware of its own inability to make any proclamation of value, ethics or policy about the nature of truth".

Georges Gurvitch was interested in the fusion of simultaneous manifestation of law in various forms and at various levels of social interaction. His aim was to devise the concept of "social law" as a law of integration and cooperation. Gurvitch's social law was an integral part of his general sociology. "It is also one of the early sociological contributions to the theory of legal pluralism, since it challenged all conceptions of law based on a single source of legal, political, or moral authority".

As a discipline, the sociology of law had an early reception in Argentina. As a local movement of legal scholars steeming from the work of Carlos Cossio, South American researchers have focused on comparative law and sociological insights, constitutional law and society, human rights, and psycho-social approaches to the legal practices.

Legal writers in colonial India mostly compiled indigenous customs and religious traditions, largely ignoring the common law of the legal system that was replacing indigenous law. Only after legislative authority was established did Indian legal scholars under the influence of John Austin begin to describe this phenomenon of codification and common law. Most works focused on litigation, but one writer, Ashutosh Mukherjee stood out: "The law is neither trade nor solemn jugglery but a living science in the proper sense of the word".

== Sociological approaches to the study of law ==
=== Modern sociology of law ===
The sociology of law became clearly established as an academic field of learning and empirical research after the Second World War. After World War II, the study of law was not central in sociology, although some well-known sociologists did write about the role of law in society. In the work of Talcott Parsons, for instance, law is conceived as an essential mechanism of social control. In response to the criticisms that were developed against functionalism, other sociological perspectives of law emerged. Critical sociologists, developed a perspective of law as an instrument of power. However, other theorists in the sociology of law, such as Philip Selznick, argued that modern law became increasingly responsive to a society's needs and had to be approached morally as well. Still other scholars, most notably the American sociologist Donald Black (whose 1976 book The Behavior of Law is considered a foundational and core text for the subfield), developed a resolutely scientific theory of law on the basis of a paradigm of pure sociology. As "pure science" sociology of law is not concentrated on offenders, but on the functions or consequences of disorder, violence and criminality, approached as products of the physical and social environment determined by law, morality, education and all other forms of social organization. In turn, as ´´applied science´´ it is focused on the solution of concrete problems, which is why - given the theoretical and methodological shortcomings of the study of causes and effects particularly in crime-related matters - the attention of contemporary sociologists is absorbed in the identification and analysis of risk factors (e.g., turning children and youth in potential offenders) and protective factors (tending to bring about "normal" personalities and ´"good" community members) Equally broad in orientation, but again different, is the autopoietic systems theory of the German sociologist Niklas Luhmann, who presents law or "the legal system" as one of the ten function systems (see functional differentiation) of society.

All collective human life is directly or indirectly shaped by law. Law is like knowledge, an essential and all-pervasive fact of the social condition.

— Niklas Luhmann, A Sociological Theory of Law

Social philosopher Jürgen Habermas disagrees with Luhmann and argues that the law can do a better job as a 'system' institution' by representing more faithfully the interests of everyday people in the 'lifeworld'. Yet another sociological theory of law and lawyers is that of Pierre Bourdieu and his followers, who see law as a social field in which actors struggle for cultural, symbolic and economic capital and in so doing develop the reproductive professional habitus of the lawyer. In several continental European countries empirical research in sociology of law developed strongly from the 1960s and 1970s. In Poland the work of Adam Podgórecki and his associates (often influenced by Petrazycki's ideas) was especially notable; in Sweden empirical research in sociology of law in this period was pioneered especially by Per Stjernquist, and in Norway by Vilhelm Aubert.

In more recent years, a very wide range of theories has emerged in the sociology of law as a result of the proliferation of theories in sociology at large. Among the recent influences can be mentioned the work of the French philosopher Michel Foucault, the German social theorist Jürgen Habermas, feminism, postmodernism and deconstruction, neo-Marxism, and behaviorism. The variety of theoretical influences in the sociology of law has also marked the broader law and society field. The multi-disciplinary law and society field remains very popular, while the disciplinary speciality field of the sociology of law is also "better organized than ever in institutional and professional respects".

=== Law and Society ===
Law and Society is an American movement, which was established after the Second World War through the initiative mainly of sociologists who had a vested interest in the study of law. The rationale of the Law and Society movement is subtly summed up in two short sentences by Lawrence Friedman: "Law is a massive vital presence in the United States. It is too important to be left to lawyers". Its founders believed that the "study of law and legal institutions in their social context could be constituted as a scholarly field distinguished by its commitment to interdisciplinary dialogue and multidisciplinary research methods". As such, “the basic assumption underlying this work is that law is not autonomous — that is, independent of society.” Whereas “conventional legal scholarship looks inside the legal system to answer questions of society,” the “law and society movement looks outside, and treats the degree of autonomy, if any, as an empirical question.” Moreover, law and society scholarship expresses a deep concern with the impact that laws have on society once they enter into force, a concern that is either ignored or under addressed in conventional legal scholarship. The establishment of the Law and Society Association in 1964 and of the Law and Society Review in 1966 guaranteed continuity in the scholarly activities of the Law and Society movement and allowed its members to influence legal education and policy-making in the US.

On one view, the main difference between the sociology of law and Law and Society is that the latter does not limit itself theoretically or methodologically to sociology and tries instead to accommodate insights from all social science disciplines. "Not only does it provides a home for sociologists and social anthropologists and political scientists with an interest in law, it also tries to incorporate psychologists and economists who study law." From another point of view, both sociology of law and Law and Society should be seen as multi-disciplinary or trans-disciplinary enterprises although sociology of law has special ties to the methods, theories and traditions of sociology.

During the 1970s and 1980s a number of original empirical studies were conducted by Law and Society scholars on conflict and dispute resolution. In his early work, William Felstiner, for example, focused on alternative ways to solve conflicts (avoidance, mediation, litigation etc.). Together with Richard Abel and Austin Sarat, Felstiner developed the idea of a disputes pyramid and the formula "naming, blaming, claiming", which refers to different stages of conflict resolution and levels of the pyramid.

=== Sociological jurisprudence ===
The sociology of law is usually distinguished from sociological jurisprudence. As a form of jurisprudence, the latter is not primarily concerned with contributing directly to social science and instead engages directly with juristic debates involving legal practice and legal theory. Sociological jurisprudence focuses juristic attention on variation in legal institutions and practices and on the social sources and effects of legal ideas. It draws intellectual resources from social theory and relies explicitly on social science research in understanding evolving forms of regulation and the cultural significance of law.

In its pioneer form it was developed in the United States by Louis Brandeis and Roscoe Pound. It was influenced by the work of pioneer legal sociologists, such as the Austrian jurist Eugen Ehrlich and the Russian-French sociologist Georges Gurvitch.

Although distinguishing between different branches of the social scientific studies of law allows us to explain and analyse the development of the sociology of law in relation to mainstream sociology and legal studies, it can be argued that such potentially artificial distinctions are not necessarily fruitful for the development of the field as whole. On this view, for the social scientific studies of law to transcend the theoretical and empirical limits that currently define their scope, they need to go beyond artificial distinctions.

== Socio-legal studies ==
'Socio-legal studies' in the UK has grown mainly out of the interest of law schools in promoting interdisciplinary studies of law. Whether regarded as an emerging discipline, sub-discipline or a methodological approach, it is often viewed in light of its relationship to, and oppositional role within, law. It should not, therefore, be confused with the legal sociology of many West European countries or the Law and Society scholarship in the US, which foster much stronger disciplinary ties with social sciences. In the past, it has been presented as the applied branch of the sociology of law and criticised for being empiricist and atheoretical. Max Travers, for example, regards socio-legal studies as a subfield of social policy, 'mainly concerned with influencing or serving government policy in the provision of legal services' and adds that it "has given up any aspirations it once had to develop general theories about the policy process".

Notable practitioners of socio-legal studies include Professor Carol Smart, co-director of the Morgan Centre for the Study of Relationships and Personal Life, (named after the sociologist, David Morgan), as well as Professor Mavis Maclean and John Eekelaar who are joint directors of the Oxford Centre for Family Law and Policy (OXFLAP).

Socio-legal methods of investigation

The sociology of law has no methods of investigation which have been developed specifically for conducting socio-legal research. Instead, it employs a wide variety of social scientific methods, including qualitative and quantitative research techniques, to explore law and legal phenomena. Positivistic as well as interpretive (such as discourse analysis) and ethnographic approaches to data collection and analysis is used within the socio-legal field.

== Sociology of law in Britain ==
Sociology of law was a small, but developing, sub-field of British sociology and legal scholarship at the time when Campbell and Wiles wrote their review of law and society research in 1976. Unfortunately, despite its initial promise, it has remained a small field. Very few empirical sociological studies are published each year. Nevertheless, there have been some excellent studies, representing a variety of sociological traditions as well as some major theoretical contributions. The two most popular approaches during the 1960s and 1970s were interactionism and Marxism.

Symbolic interactionism and Marxism

Interactionism had become popular in America in the 1950s and 1960s as a politically radical alternative to structural-functionalism. Instead of viewing society as a system regulating and controlling the actions of individuals, interactionists argued that sociology should address what people were doing in particular situations, and how they understood their own actions. The sociology of deviance, which included topics such as crime, homosexuality, and mental illness, became the focus for these theoretical debates. Functionalists had portrayed crime as a problem to be managed by the legal system. Labeling theorists, by contrast, focused on the process of law-making and enforcement: how crime was constructed as a problem. A number of British sociologists, and some researchers in law schools, have drawn on these ideas in writing about law and crime.

The most influential sociological approach during this period was, however, Marxism—which claimed to offer a scientific and comprehensive understanding of society as a whole in the same way as structural-functionalism, although with the emphasis on the struggle between different groups for material advantage, rather than value-consensus. This approach caught the imagination of many people with left-wing political views in law schools, but it also generated some interesting empirical studies. These included historical studies about how particular statutes were used to advance the interests of dominant economic groups, and also Pat Carlen's memorable ethnography, which combined analytic resources from Marxism and interactionism, especially the sociology of Erving Goffman, in writing about magistrates' courts.

The Oxford Centre for Socio-Legal Studies

The 1980s were also a fruitful time for empirical sociology of law in Britain, mainly because Donald Harris deliberately set out to create the conditions for a fruitful exchange between lawyers and sociologists at the University of Oxford Centre for Socio-Legal Studies. He was fortunate enough to recruit a number of young and talented social scientists, including J. Maxwell Atkinson and Robert Dingwall who were interested in ethnomethodology, conversation analysis, and the sociology of the professions, and Doreen McBarnet who became something of a cult figure on the left after publishing her doctoral thesis, which advanced a particularly clear and vigorous Marxist analysis of the criminal justice system. Ethnomethodology has not previously been mentioned in this review, and tends to be overlooked by many reviewers in this field since it cannot easily be assimilated to their theoretical interests. One can note, however, that it has always offered a more radical and thorough-going way of theorizing action than interactionism (although the two approaches have a lot in common when compared to traditions that view society as a structural whole, like Marxism or structural-functionalism). During his time at the center, J. Maxwell Atkinson collaborated with Paul Drew, a sociologist at the University of York, in what became the first conversation analytic study of courtroom interaction, using transcripts of coroner's hearings in Northern Ireland.

Another area of interest developed at Oxford during this period was the sociology of the professions. Robert Dingwall and Philip Lewis edited what remains an interesting and theoretically diverse collection, bringing together specialists from the sociology of law and medicine. The best known study to date has, however, been published by the American scholar Richard Abel who employed ideas and concepts from functionalist, Marxist, and Weberian sociology to explain the high incomes and status that British lawyers enjoyed for most of the twentieth century.

Recent developments

Since the 1980s, relatively few empirical studies of law and legal institutions have been conducted by British sociologists, i.e. studies which are empirical and at the same time engage with the theoretical concerns of sociology. There are, however, some exceptions. To begin with, sociology of law, along with so many areas of academic work, has been enlivened and renewed through engagement with feminism. There has been a great deal of interest in the implications of Foucault's ideas on governmentality for understanding law, and also in continental thinkers such as Niklas Luhmann and Pierre Bourdieu. Again, one can argue that rather fewer empirical studies have been produced than one might have hoped, but a great deal of interesting work has been published.

A second exception is to be found in the works of researchers who have employed resources from ethnomethodology and symbolic interactionism in studying legal settings. This type of research is clearly sociological rather than socio-legal research because it continually engages in debate with other theoretical traditions in sociology. Max Travers' doctoral thesis about the work of a firm of criminal lawyers took other sociologists, and especially Marxists, to task for not addressing or respecting how lawyers and clients understand their own actions (a standard argument used by ethnomethodologists in debates with structural traditions in the discipline). It also, however, explored issues raised by legal thinkers in their critique of structural traditions in sociology of law: the extent to which social science can address the content of legal practice.

Despite the relatively limited developments in recent empirical research, theoretical debates in sociology of law have been important in British literature during recent decades, with contributions from David Nelken exploring the problems of a comparative sociology of law and the potential of the idea of legal cultures, Roger Cotterrell seeking to develop a new view of the relations of law and community to replace what he sees as outdated 'law and society' paradigms, and other scholars, such as David Schiff and Richard Nobles, examining the potential of Luhmannian systems theory and the extent to which law can be seen as an autonomous social field rather than as intimately interrelated with other aspects of the social. Also significant has been the burgeoning field of socio-legal research on regulation and government, to which British scholars have been prominent contributors.

== Devising a sociological concept of law ==
In contrast to the traditional understanding of law (see the separate entry on law), the sociology of law does not normally view and define the law only as a system of rules, doctrine and decisions, which exist independently of the society out of which it has emerged. The rule-based aspect of law is, admittedly, important, but provides an inadequate basis for describing, analysing and understanding law in its societal context. Thus, legal sociology regards law as a set of institutional practices which have evolved over time and developed in relation to, and through interaction with, cultural, economic and socio-political structures and institutions. As a modern social system, law does strive to gain and retain its autonomy to function independently of other social institutions and systems such as religion, polity and economy. Yet, it remains historically and functionally linked to these other institutions. Thus, one of the objectives of the sociology of law remains to devise empirical methodologies capable of describing and explaining modern law's interdependence with other social institutions.

Social evolution has converted law into a mighty – perhaps the most important – reference of civilised life by substituting traditional bonds conditioned by identities of “blood” or territory for a new type of subordination specifically legal and voluntary between actors that are equal and free. The degree of abstraction of rules and legal principles increases constantly, the system acquires autonomy and control over its own dynamics, allowing the normative order of society to manage without religious legitimation and the authority of customs. In modern societies law is thus distinguished by

(1) its autonomy in relation to politics, religion, nonlegal institutions and other academic disciplines; it is a set of fixed rules which thanks to the power of the state acquires binding force and remains effective, imposing norms of conduct to individuals, social groups and entire societies; and also a social technique, a system of behaviour regulation endowed with a very special and artificial linguistic form kept at safe distance from vague and fluid colloquial language, in a permanent state of transformation;

(2) its corporations and professional guilds of lawmakers, judges, solicitors, legal scholars;

(3) its idealised institutions, conceived less by tradition than by force of systematisation; and

(4) its process of education oriented towards explanation and evaluation of juridical entities, rules, regulations, statutes etc.

Some influential approaches within the sociology of law have challenged definitions of law in terms of official (state) law (see for example Eugen Ehrlich's concept of "living law" and Georges Gurvitch's "social law"). From this standpoint, law is understood broadly to include not only the legal system and formal (or official) legal institutions and processes, but also various informal (or unofficial) forms of normativity and regulation which are generated within groups, associations and communities. The sociological studies of law are, thus, not limited to analysing how the rules or institutions of the legal system interact with social class, gender, race, religion, sexuality and other social categories. They also focus on how the internal normative orderings of various groups and "communities", such as the community of lawyers, businessmen, scientists, members of political parties, or members of the Mafia, interact with each other. In short, law is studied as an integral and constitutive part of social institutions, groupings and communities. This approach is developed further under the section on legal pluralism.

== Non-Western sociology of law ==
The interest in the sociology of law continues to be more widespread in Western countries than in areas with cultures that developed substantially outside the Greek-Judeo-Christian tradition of Western culture (including East Asia, Southeast Asia, the Indian subcontinent, the Middle East, and sub-Saharan Africa). Some important research has been produced by Indian scholars, but there remains only a limited amount of socio-legal work by researchers from, for example, the Middle East or central and northern parts of Africa. Thus, the global spread of sociological studies of law appears uneven and concentrated, above all, in industrialised nations with democratic political systems. In this sense, the global expansion of legal sociology “is not taking place uniformly across national boundaries and appears to correlate with a combination of factors such as national wealth/poverty and form of political organisation, as well as historical factors such as the growth of the welfare state... However, none of these factors alone can explain this disparity”.

== Contemporary perspectives ==
=== Legal pluralism ===
Legal pluralism is a concept developed by legal sociologists and social anthropologists "to describe multiple layers of law, usually with different sources of legitimacy, that exist within a single state or society". It is also defined "as a situation in which two or more legal systems coexist in the same social field". Legal pluralists define law broadly to include not only the system of courts and judges backed by the coercive power of the state, but also the "non-legal forms of normative ordering". Legal pluralism consists of many different methodological approaches and as a concept, it embraces "diverse and often contested perspectives on law, ranging from the recognition of different legal orders within the nation-state, to a more far reaching and open-ended concept of law that does not necessarily depend on state recognition for validity. This latter concept of law may come into being whenever two or more legal systems exist in the same social field".

The ideology of legal positivism has had such a powerful hold on the imagination of lawyers and social scientists that its picture of the legal world has been able successfully to masquerade as fact and has formed the foundation stone of social and legal theory.

— John Griffiths, "What is Legal Pluralism"

Legal pluralism has occupied a central position in socio-legal theorising from the very beginning of the sociology of law. The sociological theories of Eugen Ehrlich and Georges Gurvitch were early sociological contributions to legal pluralism. It has, moreover, provided the most enduring topic of socio-legal debate over many decades within both the sociology of law and legal anthropology. and has received more than its share of criticism from the proponents of the various schools of legal positivism. The critics often ask: "How is law distinguished in a pluralist view from other normative systems? What makes a social rule system legal?".

The controversy arises mainly "from the claim that the only true law is the law made and enforced by the modern state". This standpoint is also known as "legal centralism". From a legal centralist standpoint, John Griffiths writes, "law is and should be the law of the state, uniform for all persons, exclusive of all other law, and administrated by a single set of state institutions. Thus, according to legal centralism, "customary laws and religious laws are not properly called 'law' except in so far as state has chosen to adopt and treat any such normative order as part of its own law".

A distinction is often made between the "weak" and the "strong" versions of legal pluralism. The "weak" version does not necessarily question the main assumptions of "legal centralism", but only recognises that within the domain of the Western state law other legal systems, such as customary or Islamic law, may also have an autonomous (co-)existence. Thus, the "weak" version does not consider other forms of normative ordering as law. As Tamanaha, one of the critics of legal pluralism, puts it: "Normative ordering is, well, normative ordering. Law is something else, something that we isolate out and call law…". The "strong" version, on the other hand, rejects all legal centralist and formalist models of law, as "a myth, an ideal, a claim, an illusion," regarding state law as one among many forms of law or forms of social ordering. It insists that modern law is plural, that it is private as well as public, but most importantly "the national (public official) legal system is often a secondary rather than the primary locus of regulation".

The criticism directed at legal pluralism often uses the basic assumptions of legal positivism to question the validity of theories of legal pluralism which aim at criticising those very (positivistic) assumptions. As Roger Cotterrell explains, the pluralist conception should be understood as part of "the legal sociologist's effort to broaden perspectives on law. A legal sociologist's specification of law might be different from that presupposed by a lawyer in practice, but it will relate (indeed, in some way incorporate) the latter because it must (if it is to reflect legal experience) take account of lawyers' perspectives on law. Thus a pluralist approach in legal theory is likely to recognise what lawyers typically recognize as law, but may see this law as one species of a larger genus, or treat lawyers' conception of law as reflecting particular perspectives determined by particular objectives".

=== Autopoiesis ===
Humberto Maturana and Francisco Varela originally coined the concept of autopoiesis within theoretical biology to describe the self-reproduction of living cells through self-reference. This concept was later borrowed, reconstructed in sociological terms, and introduced into the sociology of law by Niklas Luhmann. Luhmann's systems theory transcends the classical understanding of object/subject by regarding communication (and not 'action') as the basic element of any social system. He breaks with traditional systems theory of Talcott Parsons and descriptions based on cybernetic feedback loops and structural understandings of self-organisation of the 1960s. This allows him to work towards devising a solution to the problem of the humanised 'subject'.

"Perhaps the most challenging idea incorporated in the theory of autopoiesis is that social systems should not be defined in terms of human agency or norms, but of communications. Communication is in turn the unity of utterance, information and understanding and constitutes social systems by recursively reproducing communication. This sociologically radical thesis, which raises the fear of a dehumanised theory of law and society, attempts to highlight the fact that social systems are constituted by communication."

According to Roger Cotterrell, "Luhmann... treats the theory as the basis for all general sociological analysis of social systems and their mutual relations. But its theoretical claims about law's autonomy are very powerful postulates, presented in advance of (and even, perhaps, in place of) the kind of detailed empirical study of social and legal change that comparatists and most legal sociologists are likely to favour. The postulates of autopoiesis theory do not so much guide empirical research as explain conclusively how to interpret whatever this research may discover."

=== Legal cultures ===
Legal culture is one of the central concepts of the sociology of law. The study of legal cultures may, at the same time, be regarded as one of the general approaches within the sociology of law.

As a concept, it refers to "relatively stable patterns of legally-oriented social behaviour and attitudes," and as such is regarded as a subcategory of the concept of culture. It is a relatively new concept which, according to David Nelken, can be traced to "terms like legal tradition or legal style, which have a much longer history in comparative law or in early political science. It presupposes and invites us to explore the existence of systematic variations in patterns in 'law in the books' and 'law in action,' and, above all, in the relation between them".

As an approach, it focuses on the cultural aspects of law, legal behaviour and legal institutions and, thus, has affinity with cultural anthropology, legal pluralism, and comparative law.

Lawrence M. Friedman is among socio-legal scholars who introduced the idea of legal culture into the sociology of law. For Friedman, legal culture "refers to public knowledge of and attitudes and behaviour patterns toward the legal system". It can also consist of "bodies of custom organically related to the culture as a whole. Friedman stresses the plurality of legal cultures and points out that one can explore legal cultures at different levels of abstraction, e.g. at the level of the legal system, the state, the country, or the community. Friedman is also known for introducing the distinction between the "internal" and "external" legal cultures. Somewhat oversimplified, the former refers to the general attitudes and perceptions of law among the functionaries of the legal system, such as the judiciary, while the latter can refer to the attitude of the citizenry to the legal system or to law and order generally.

=== Feminism ===
Law has always been regarded as one of the important sites of engagement for feminism. As pointed out by Ruth Fletcher feminist engagement with the law has taken many forms through the years, which also indicates their successful merging of theory and practice: "Through litigation, campaigns for reform and legal education, feminists have engaged explicitly with law and the legal profession. In taking on the provisions of specialist advice services, women's groups have played a role in making law accessible to those in need. By subjecting legal concepts and methods to critical analysis, feminists have questioned the terms of legal debate."

=== Globalization ===
Globalization is often defined in terms of economic processes which bring about radical cultural developments at the level of world society. Although law is an essential ingredient of the process of globalization - and important studies of law and globalization were already conducted in the 1990s by, for example, Yves Dezalay and Bryant Garth and Volkmar Gessner - law's importance for creating and maintaining the globalization processes are often neglected within the sociology of globalization and remain, arguably, somewhat underdeveloped within the sociology of law.

As pointed out by Halliday and Osinsky, "Economic globalization cannot be understood apart from global business regulation and the legal construction of the markets on which it increasingly depends. Cultural globalization cannot be explained without attention to intellectual property rights institutionalized in law and global governance regimes. The globalization of protections for vulnerable populations cannot be comprehended without tracing the impact of international criminal and humanitarian law or international tribunals. Global contestation over the institutions of democracy and state building cannot be meaningful unless considered in relation to constitutionalism."

The socio-legal approaches to the study of globalization and global society often overlap with, or make use of, studies of legal cultures and legal pluralism.

== Professional associations or societies ==
- Research Committee on Sociology of Law
- International Institute for the Sociology of Law
- Law and Society Association
- The Law and Society Association of Australia and New Zealand Inc.
- Canadian Law and Society Association / Association canadienne droit et société (CLSA/ACDS)
- RT 13 (Thematic Network) sociology of law of the French Sociological Association
- Sociedad argentina de sociología jurídica
- Associazione di studi su diritto e società (Italy)
- Japanese Association of Sociology of Law
- Brazilian Sociology of Law Association (ABraSD)

== Journals ==
- The Nordic Journal of Law and Justice
- Zeitschrift für Rechtssoziologie
- Law & Social Inquiry
- Law and Society Review
- The Journal of Law and Society
- Journal of Empirical Legal Studies
- Canadian Journal of Law and Society / Revue Canadienne Droit et Société (since 1985)
- Canadian Journal of Women and the Law (since 1985)
- Droit et Société (Paris, France, since 1985)
- International Journal of the Sociology of Law (since 1978)
- Oñati Socio-legal Series (Oñati, Spain, since 2011)
- Revista Brasileira de Sociologia do Direito (Brasil, since 2014)
- Revue interdisciplinaire d'études juridiques (Brussels, Belgium, since 1978)
- Social & Legal Studies (London, United Kingdom, since 1992)
- Sociologia del Diritto (Milan, Italy, since 1974)
- Zeitschrift für Rechtssoziologie The German Journal of Law and Society

== Research centres ==
- American Bar Foundation
- Baldy Center for Law and Social Policy
- Brazilian Sociology of Law Association (ABraSD), Brazil
- Sociology of Law Institute, Lund University, Sweden
- Centre d'étude, de technique et d'évaluation législatives Université de Genève
- Centre for Law and Society, School of Law, University of Edinburgh
- Centre for Socio-Legal Research - University of Cape Town, South Africa
- Centre for Socio-Legal Studies - University of Natal, South Africa
- Center for Socio-Legal Studies - University of Oxford
- Center for the Study of Law and Society, California, Berkeley, USA
- European Academy for Law and Legislation
- Foundation for Law, Justice and Society, Wolfson College, Oxford
- Institute of Global Law
- Institute of Law and Social Sciences, Meiji University, Tokyo, Japan
- Institute for Legal Studies, University of Wisconsin, USA
- International Institute for the Sociology of Law, Oñati
- Justice Policy Research Centre - University of Newcastle, Australia
- Laboratoire de sociologie juridique (Panthéon-Assas University)
- Legal Intersections Research Centre - University of Wollongong, Australia
- Observatório Permanente da Justiça Portuguesa (Coimbra)
- Oxford Centre for Family Law and Policy, UK
- Research Institute for Law, Politics & Justice Keele University

== See also ==
- Social policy
- Vilhelm Aubert
- Erhard Blankenburg
- Jean Carbonnier
- Roger Cotterrell
- Émile Durkheim
- Eugen Ehrlich
- William L.F. Felstiner
- Lawrence M. Friedman
- Theodor Geiger
- Volkmar Gessner
- Niklas Luhmann
- Henry James Sumner Maine
- Bronisław Malinowski
- Thomas Mathiesen
- David Nelken
- Adam Podgórecki
- Roscoe Pound
- Philip Selznick
- Per Stjernquist
- Renato Treves
- William Graham Sumner
- Nicholas Timasheff
- Max Weber
