= Volkmar Gessner =

German university professor (1937–2014)

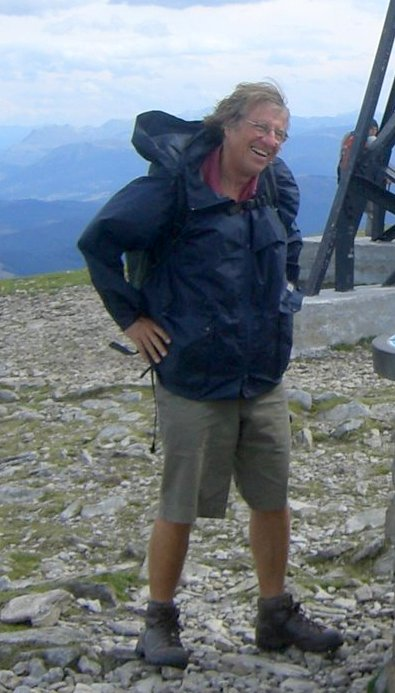
- Volkmar Gessner near Bilbao, September 2006
- Born: October 9, 1937
- Died: November 8, 2014 (aged 77); Bremen, Germany
- Education: LMU Munich; University of Münster (Dr. iur.); Bielefeld University (Dr. habil)
- Occupations: University professor, socio-legal scholar
- Employers: University of Bremen; Max Planck Institute for Comparative and International Private Law; University of California, Santa Barbara; International Institute for the Sociology of Law
- Awards: Adam Podgòrecki Prize (2013)

Volkmar Gessner (9 October 1937 – 8 November 2014) was a German university professor and a socio-legal scholar.

== Career ==
Gessner studied sociology and law at LMU Munich. He received a doctorate in law from the University of Münster in 1969 and the habilitation from the faculty of sociology at Bielefeld University. After serving as a civil judge in Münster and Recklinghausen, he worked at the Max Planck Institute for Comparative and International Private Law in Hamburg, where he headed a social science working group after 1975. In 1980, Gessner was appointed professor of Sociology of Law, Comparative Law and European Legal Policy at the University of Bremen. From 1980 to 1990, he also served as one of the directors of the newly founded Zentrum für Europäische Rechtspolitik (ZERP) in Bremen (Center for European Legal Policy). From 1997 to 1999, he was a visiting professor at the University of California, Santa Barbara. After his retirement from the University of Bremen in 2003, he served until 2005 as Scientific Director of the International Institute for the Sociology of Law in Oñati, Spain.

== Achievements ==
Both in his publications and organizational work, Gessner made major contributions to the development of contemporary sociology of law. In 1988, as the then secretary of the Research Committee on Sociology of Law, he was instrumental in setting up the International Institute for the Sociology of Law (IISL). He was specifically involved in creating its International Master's Programme in Sociology of Law in 1990. His academic publications focus on conflict resolution through law, on legal cultures and on the importance of legal certainty in a globalized world. For his achievements, he received the Adam Podgòrecki price of the RCSL in 2013

== Selected publications ==
=== Monographs ===
- El otro derecho comparado. Ensayos sobre cultura y seguridad juridica en la era de la globalization. Traducción y edición Hector Fix-Fierro. Universidad Nacional Autonoma de Mexico 2013.
- European Legal Cultures, Aldershot: Dartmouth 1996 (with Armin Höland and Csaba Varga).
- Cost of Judicial Barriers for the Consumer in the Single Market, Commission of the European Union, Luxembourg: Office for Official Publications 1995 (with Hanno von Freyhold, Enzo Vial and Helmut Wagner).
- Recht und Konflikt : eine soziologische Untersuchung privatrechtlicher Konflikte in Mexiko. Tübingen 1976: Mohr. ISBN 3-16-638382-4
- Der Richter im Staatenkonflikt: Eine Untersuchung am Beispiel des Völkerrechtsverkehrs der amerikanischen Republiken. Berlin 1969: Duncker u. Humblot.

=== Edited books ===
- Contractual Certainty in International Trade – Empirical Studies and Theoretical Debates on Institutional Support for Global Economic Exchanges, Oxford: Hart, 2009.
- European Ways of Law – Towards a European Sociology of Law, Oxford: Hart, 2007 (with David Nelken). A Chinese translation has been published in 2009.
- Globalization and Resistance – Law Reform in Asia since the Crisis, Oxford: Hart, 2007 (with Christoph Antons).
- Rules and Networks – The Legal Culture of Global Business Transactions, Oxford: Hart, September 2001 (with Richard P. Appelbaum and William L.F. Felstiner).
- Emerging Legal Certainty: Empirical Studies on the Globalization of Law, Aldershot: Ashgate 1998 (with Ali Cem Budak).
- Foreign Courts - Civil Litigation in Foreign Legal Cultures, Aldershot: Dartmouth 1996.
- Normenerosion, Baden-Baden: Nomos 1996 (mit Monika Frommel)
- Socio-Legal Research and Policy Studies. Law and Policy (Special Issue) 1988, Vol. 10, Nos. 2 & 3 (with John Thomas).
- Gegenkultur und Recht, Baden-Baden: Nomos, 1985 (mit W. Hassemer).
- Rechtsformen der Verflechtung von Staat und Wirtschaft, Jahrbuch für Rechtssoziologie und Rechtstheorie, Bd. 8, Opladen: Westdeutscher Verlag 1982 (mit G. Winter).
- Umweltschutz und Rechtssoziologie, Bielefeld: Gieseking, 1978 (mit W. Harth, F. Hirtz, O. Kießler, K. Ziegert).
- Gastarbeiter in Gesellschaft und Recht. München: Beck 1974 (Beck'sche Schwarze Reihe, Bd. 108) (mit T. Ansay).

== Recent articles ==
- The Use of Social Science Information in Law - Comment on the British Inquiry Report (2006), Sortuz. Oñati Journal of Emergent Socio-legal Studies Volume 6, Issue 1 (2014) pp. 29–45. Available at: http://opo.iisj.net/index.php/sortuz/article/view/486.
- State/society Synergies in Western and Japanese Economic Law and Judicial Reform, in Dimitri Vanoverbeke, Jeroen Maesschalck, David Nelken and Stephan Parmentier (eds), The Changing Role of Law in Japan: Empirical Studies in Culture, Society and Policy Making, Cheltenham: Edward Elgar Publishing, 2014, 35-49, available from https://ssrn.com/abstract=1912048
- Weberian versus Pluralistic Legal Forces in the Global Political Economy, paper presented at the workshop Law, Contestation, and Power in the Global Political Economy, coordinated by Edward S. Cohen (Westminster College) and A. Claire Cutler (University of Victoria), Oñati Socio-Legal Series, v. 3 n. 4 (2013), http://opo.iisj.net/index.php/osls/issue/archive, also available from: https://ssrn.com/abstract=2272595
- Enabling Global Business Transactions: Relational and Legal Mechanisms, in Glenn Morgan and Richard Whitley (eds.), Capitalisms and Capitalism in the Twenty-First Century, Oxford University Press, 2012, 146-165. Paperback edition 2014. Available from https://ssrn.com/abstract=1911883
- Theories of Change – the Governance of Business Transactions in Globalizing Economies, in Volkmar Gessner (ed.), Contractual Certainty in International Trade – Empirical Studies and Theoretical Debates on Institutional Support for Global Economic Exchanges, Oxford, Hart, 2009, 175-213.
- Towards a Theoretical Framework for Contractual Certainty in Global Trade, in Volkmar Gessner (ed.), Contractual Certainty in International Trade – Empirical Studies and Theoretical Debates on Institutional Support for Global Economic Exchanges, Oxford, Hart, 2009, 3-27.
- Towards a Socio-Legal Theory of Contractual Risk, 36 Sociologia del Diritto 2009, 83-92. Available from https://ssrn.com/abstract=1918255
- Legalization and the Varieties of Capitalism, in Christoph Antons und Volkmar Gessner (eds), Globalization and Resistance – Law Reform in Asia since the Crisis, Oxford, Hart, 2007, 27-51.
