= Richard Abel =

Richard Abel may refer to:

- Richard Abel (cultural historian) (born 1941), emeritus professor of film and media
- Richard Abel (lawyer) (born 1941), American professor of law
- Richard Abel (musician) (born 1955), Canadian instrumental musician and pianist
- Richard Abel (politician), American politician from New Hampshire
- Richard F. Abel (1933–2022), brigadier general in the United States Air Force

== See also ==
- Richard Abels (born 1951), American historian
