= Journal of Law and Society =

- Discipline: Sociology of law
- Language: English
- Edited by: Philip Thomas

Publication details
- Former name(s): British Journal of Law and Society
- History: 1974–present
- Publisher: John Wiley & Sons on behalf of the Cardiff School of Law and Politics
- Frequency: Quarterly
- Impact factor: 0.714 (2017)

Standard abbreviations
- ISO 4: J. Law Soc.

Indexing
- ISSN: 0263-323X
- LCCN: 83642269
- OCLC no.: 750962784

Links
- Journal homepage; Online access; Online archive

The Journal of Law and Society is a quarterly peer-reviewed law journal which publishes papers in the field of the sociology of law. It was established in 1974 as the British Journal of Law and Society, obtaining its current name in 1982. It is published by John Wiley & Sons on behalf of the Cardiff School of Law and Politics. Since its founding, the journal's editor-in-chief has been Philip Thomas (Cardiff School of Law and Politics). According to the Journal Citation Reports, the journal has a 2017 impact factor of 0.714, ranking it 101st out of 150 journals in the category "Law" and 107th out of 147 journals in the category "sociology".
