= Bill Felstiner =

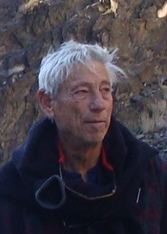
Bill Felstiner (Aspendell, 2009)

William L. F. Felstiner (born December 14, 1929), usually known as Bill Felstiner, is a socio-legal scholar.

== Education and early career ==
Bill Felstiner was born in New York, and graduated from Phillips Exeter Academy and Yale College. He received his LL.B. from Yale Law School in 1958. In 1965, he was hired as regional legal advisor of the USAID Mission to Greece & Turkey and in due course appointed assistant director of the US AID Mission to India (until 1968).

== Teaching and research ==
In 1969, Bill Felstiner started a university teaching career as associate dean and lecturer at Yale Law School. While at Yale he helped direct the Yale Program in Law and Modernization. In 1973 he joined UCLA as assistant professor. In 1976 he decided to devote full-time to research, working, first, at the USC's Social Science Research Institute, then at the Rand Corporation's Civil Justice Institute and, finally, at the American Bar Foundation, of which he was executive director. While at USC he served as co-PI of the US Justice Department-funded Civil Litigation Research Project. Then he moved back to teaching and to the university. After teaching in political science at Northwestern University, he became professor of sociology in the Law and Society Program at the University of California, Santa Barbara (1992–1999). In the years 2000-2003 he was director of the International Institute for the Sociology of Law in Oñati (Gipuzkoa, Spain). From 1995 to 2005 he also held the position of Distinguished Research Professor of Law at Cardiff University (Wales, UK).

== Areas of special interest ==
In his early work, Bill Felstiner focussed on alternative ways to solve conflicts (avoidance, mediation, litigation etc.), touring Western Europe for possible models both in criminal and civil procedure. He continued his interest in litigation and alternatives to litigation as co-PI of the Civil Litigation Research Project (CLRP)a joint venture of USC and the University of Wisconsin funded by the US Department of Justice, conducted a major study of litigation in federal courts and the operation of alternative fora for civil disputes. Felstiner participated in all aspects of CLRP's work and (together with Rick Abel and Austin Sarat), developed the idea of a disputes pyramid and the formula "naming, blaming, claiming", which refers to different stages of conflict resolution and levels of the pyramid. At Rand's Civil Justice Institute, he initiated a long-term investigation into asbestos litigation. After that he concentrated his organizational and research energies on the legal profession, publishing a book on divorce lawyering and editing one on the legal culture of global business transactions. From 1994 to 2000, he also chaired the influential Working Group on Legal Professions of the Research Committee on Sociology of Law, which produced a number of important collections.

== Humanitarian aid organizer ==
Almost forty years after his work with USAID, Bill Felstiner returned to this earlier vocation. During the Katrina disaster in 2005, he volunteered and worked as the director of one on the largest shelters for the homeless of New Orleans. In 2007 he founded, together with colleagues from Santa Barbara, the Chad Relief Foundation (CRF) and became its first director. The organization is a non-profit NGO, whose objective is to provide assistance to refugees from the Central African Republic in South Chad and to the local population surrounding the refugee camps.

== Personal ==
Felstiner and his wife, Gray, have two sons, Ben and Paul.

== Selected publications ==
- Deep Time. Ninety Years of Mischief. Santa Barbara: El Bosque 2022.
- "Helter-Shelter". In: What Lawyers Do. Narratives from the Yale Law School Class of 1958. Santa Barbara 2018, 141–163.
- Bill Felstiner (ed.) What Lawyers Do. Narratives from the Yale Law School Class of 1958. Santa Barbara 2018.
- Reorganization and Resistance: Legal Professions Confront a Changing World (Oxford: Hart Publishing, 2005) (ed.).
- Federalismo/Federalism (Madrid: Dykinson 2004 (ed. with Manuel Calvo Garcia).
- Rules and Networks: The Legal Culture of Global Business Transactions (Oxford: Hart Publishing, 2001) (ed. with V.Gessner und R.P. Appelbaum).
- "Firm Handling: The Litigation Strategies of Defence Lawyers in Personal Injury Cases", 20 Journal of Legal Studies 1 (2000) (co-authored with Robert Dingwall et al.).
- "Justice and Power in the Legal Profession" in B.G. Garth & A. Sarat (ed) Justice and Power in Sociolegal Studies (Evanston: Northwestern University Press, 1998).
- "Professional Inattention: Origins and Consequences" in K. Hawkins (ed.) The Human Face of Law (Oxford: Oxford University Press, 1997).
- Divorce Lawyers and Their Clients: Power and Meaning in the Legal Process (New York: Oxford University Press, 1995) (with Austin Sarat).
- "Bad Arithmetic: Disaster Litigation as Less than the Sum of Its Parts" in Sheila Jasanoff (ed.), Learning from Disaster (Philadelphia: University of Pennsylvania Press, 1994) (co-authored with Tom Durkin).
- Asbestos Litigation in the United Kingdom: An Interim Report (Oxford: Centre for Socio-legal Studies; Chicago: American Bar Foundation, 1988) (co-authored with R.Dingwall).
- Asbestos in the Courts. The Challenge of Mass Toxic Torts, co-authored with Deborah Hensler u.a. (Rand Corporation, 1985). Download available: https://www.rand.org/pubs/reports/2006/R3324.pdf.
- "The Logic of Mediation" in D. Black (ed.) Toward a General Theory of Social Control (Orlando, San Diego, San Francisco: Academic Press, 1984).
- Costs of Asbestos Litigation. Mit James S. Kakalik u.a. (Rand Institute for Civil Justice 1983). Download: http://www.litagion.com/pubs/reports/2006/R3042.pdf<
- "The Economic Costs of Ordinary Litigation," 31 UCLA Law Review 72 (1983) (co-authored with David M. Trubek et al.); reprinted in part in R. Cover, D. Fiss & 1. Resnick, Procedure (Mineola, N.Y.: The Foundation Press, 1988).
- "The Emergence and Transformation of Disputes: Naming, Blaming, Claiming", coauthored with Richard Abel and Austin Sarat, 15 Law and Society Review 631 (1981) (reprinted in John J. Bonsignore et al. (eds.) Before the Law: An Introduction to the Legal Process (Boston: Houghton¬Mifflin, 4th ed., 1989).
- Community Mediation in Dorchester. Massachusetts (Washington, D.C.: Government Printing Office, 1980) (gemeinsam mit Lynn A. Williams); reprinted in R. Tomasic and M. Feeley, Neighborhood Justice (New York: Longman, 1982) and in S. Goldberg, E. Green and F. Sander, Dispute Resolution (New York: Little Brown, 1985).
- European Alternatives to Criminal Trials and their Applicability in the United States (Washington: National Institute of Law Enforcement and Criminal Justice, 1978) (co-authored with Ann Barthelmes Drew).
- “Plea Contracts in West Germany”, 13 Law & Society Review (1978), 309.
- “Mediation as an alternative to criminal prosecution Ideology and limitations”, Law and Human Behavior, Volume 2, Number 3 / September 1978, 223–244.
- "Influences of Social Organization on Dispute Processing," 9 Law and Society Review 63 (1974); reprinted in L. Friedman & S. Macaulay, Law and the Behavioral Sciences (2d ed., New York: Bobbs Merrill, 1977); in R. Cover & O. Fiss, The Structure of Procedure (Mineola, N.Y.: The Foundation Press, 1979); in R. Tomasic & M. Feeley, Neighborhood Justice (New York: Longman, 1982); and in R. Cover, O. Fiss & J. Resnick, Procedure (Mineola, N.Y.: The Foundation Press, 1988).
- “Avoidance as Dispute Processing: an Elaboration”, 9 Law & Society Review (1974), 695.
