= Per Stjernquist =

Swedish law professor

Per Stjernquist (1912–2005) was a Swedish law professor who was almost single-handedly responsible for establishing the teaching of the new field of sociology of law in Sweden from the 1960s.

Stjernquist began his career as a local judge and court official. He became a doctoral student of the celebrated 'realist' jurist Karl Olivecrona in the 1940s but, as a left-leaning liberal, soon fell out with his supervisor over Olivecrona's authoritarian politics and vocal support in the war years for Nazi Germany's hegemony in Europe.

He was professor of civil law at Lund University from 1950 to 1972 and rector of the university through the turbulent years of the late 1960s. His publications set the dominant orientation of Swedish sociology of law, and he supervised generations of research students in the subject. His first seminar in sociology of law (established against determined opposition from the Law Faculty) was taught in 1963. The subject, then regarded by many jurists as subversive or unnecessary, was offered initially for administrative science students but soon attracted students from many disciplines. The Chair of Sociology of Law at Lund was created specially for him in 1972, as an initiative of the Swedish government.

Stjernquist's work included important empirical studies of the legal mechanisms and policies of regulation of Swedish private forestry, which attempted to show the range of strategies by which law could influence social behaviour, as well as the constraints on law as a social mechanism.

He was the son of professor and university rector Martin P:son Nilsson and Hanna Stjernquist. His wife was the archaeologist Berta Stjernquist (1918-2010), also a professor at Lund. Stjernquist was Inspector of Kalmar Nation at the university from 1954 to 1996.

== Bibliography ==
- Per Stjernquist, Laws in the Forests: A Study of Public Direction of Swedish Private Forestry. Lund: CWK Gleerup (1973)
- Per Stjernquist, Poverty on the Outskirts: On Cultural Impoverishment and Cultural Integration. Stockholm: Almqvist & Wiksell (1987)
- Per Stjernquist, Forest Treatment: Relations to Nature of Swedish Private Forestry . Stockholm: Almqvist & Wiksell (1992)
- Per Stjernquist, Organized Cooperation Facing Law: An Anthropological Study. Stockholm: Almqvist & Wiksell (2000)
- Per Stjernquist, Legal Contributions to the Structure of Civil Society. Stockholm: Almqvist & Wiksell (2004)
- Antoinette Hetzler, "Sociology of Law in Sweden" in V. Ferrari (ed) Developing Sociology of Law: A World-wide Documentary Enquiry. Milano: Giuffre (1990)
- Roger Cotterrell, "Establishing Sociology of Law in Sweden" Socio-Legal Newsletter (UK Socio-Legal Studies Association) no. 23 Autumn (1997)
- Roger Cotterrell, "Per Stjernquist 1912-2005" Socio-Legal Newsletter (UK Socio-Legal Studies Association) no. 48 Spring (2006)
- Roger Cotterrell, "Northern Lights: From Swedish Realism to Sociology of Law" (2013) 40 Journal of Law and Society 657–69.
