= Lawrence M. Friedman =

American legal scholar

Lawrence Meir Friedman (born April 2, 1930) is an American law professor, historian of American legal history, and author of nonfiction and fiction books. He has been a member of the faculty at Stanford Law School since 1968. He is married to Leah Feigenbaum Friedman and they have two adult daughters, Jane and Amy.

== Biography ==
Friedman received his Bachelor of Arts from the University of Chicago in 1948 and his J.D. and LL.M from the University of Chicago Law School (where he was on the staff of the University of Chicago Law Review) in 1951 and 1953, respectively. Admitted to the bar in Illinois in 1951, he was associated with the firm of D'Ancona, Pflaum, Wyatt, and Riskind in Chicago from 1955 to 1957. At the time, his practice area was trusts and estates. Friedman taught at Saint Louis University School of Law as Assistant Professor of Law (1957–60) and as Associate Professor of Law (1960–61). He then moved to the University of Wisconsin Law School, where he was Associate Professor of Law (1961–65) and then Professor of Law (1965–68). Friedman was a Visiting Professor of Law at Stanford Law School from 1966 to 1967 and moved to Stanford in 1968. He holds courtesy appointments with Stanford's department of history and political science.

Friedman is the recipient of six honorary law degrees: LL.D. degrees from the University of Puget Sound Law School (1977), John Jay College of Criminal Justice at the City University of New York (1989), University of Lund (Sweden) (1993), John Marshall Law School (1995), and University of Macerata (Italy) (1998), and a D.Juris. from the University of Milan (Italy) (2006). Friedman is a fellow in the American Academy of Arts and Sciences. He has been the President of Law and Society Association and the Research Committee on Sociology of Law.

In 2007, Brian Leiter found that Friedman was the most-cited law professor in the field of legal history, with 1890 citations between 2000 and 2007. Friedman is also a fiction writer. He has published at least eight mystery novels, generally murder mysteries involving a San Mateo attorney named Frank May. Friedman publishes his fiction writing as "Lawrence Friedman" and his nonfiction writing as "Lawrence M. Friedman."

== Selected bibliography ==
Friedman has published thirty-four books of nonfiction. Among his most significant works are:

- The Big Trial: Law As Public Spectacle, Lawrence, Kan.: University Press of Kansas, 2015.
- Inside the Castle: Law and the Family in 20th Century America, Princeton: Princeton University Press, 2011 (co-authored with Joanna L. Grossman).
- Guarding Life's Dark Secret: Legal and Social Controls over Reputation, Propriety, and Privacy, Palo Alto, Cal.: Stanford University Press, 2007.
- Private Lives: Families, Individuals and the Law, Cambridge, Mass.: Harvard University Press, 2004.
- Law in America: A Short History, New York: Random House, 2002.
- American Law in the 20th Century, New Haven, Conn.: Yale University Press, 2002.
- The Horizontal Society, New Haven, Conn.: Yale University Press, 1999.
- Crime and Punishment in American History, New York: Basic Books, 1993.
- The Republic of Choice: Law, Authority and Culture, Cambridge, Mass.: Harvard University Press, 1990.
- Total Justice, New York: Russell Sage, 1985.
- American Law, New York: W. W. Nortion & Co., 1984 (3rd edn. 2016).
- The Roots of Justice: Crime and Punishment in Alameda County, 1870-1910, Chapel Hill, N.C.: University of North Carolina Press, 1981. (co-authored with Robert V. Percival).
- American Law and the Constitutional Order, Cambridge, Mass.: Harvard University Press, 1978.
- Law and Society: An Introduction, Englewood, N.J.: Prentice Hall, 1977.
- The Legal System: A Social Science Perspective, New York: Russell Sage Foundation, 1975.
- A History of American Law, New York: Touchstone (imprint of Simon & Schuster), 1973 (4th edn. 2009).
- Law and the Behavioral Sciences, Indianapolis, Ind.: Bobbs-Merrill, 1965.
- Contract Law in America, Madison, Wis.: University of Wisconsin Press, 1965.

Selected titles among his eight novels:

- A Heavenly Death. QP Books. 2014.
- Death of A Schemer. QP Books. 2015.
