= Susanne Karstedt =

German criminologist

Susanne Karstedt FASSA is a German criminologist. She is a professor in the School of Criminology and Criminal Justice at Griffith University in Queensland, Australia.

== Biography ==
From Germany, Kartstedt trained in sociology at the University of Hamburg. Prior to joining Griffith University, she held positions at the University of Leeds, Keele University, Bielefield University, and the University of Hamburg.

Karstedt research interests include mass atrocity crimes, state crimes, and transitional justice. She is known for work on the relationship between emotions and criminal justice.

In 2007, the American Society of Criminology presented Karstedt with the Sellin-Glueck Award, given to criminologists for the introduction of new perspectives on the problem of crime and justice outside the U.S. In 2016, she was awarded the Law and Society Association International Prize. In 2018, she received the European Society of Criminology's European Criminology Award. In 2020 she was elected Fellow of the Academy of the Social Sciences in Australia.

== Selected works ==
- Karstedt, Susanne (1998). "Coming to Terms with the Past in Germany after 1945 and 1989: Public Judgments on Procedures and Justice". Law and Policy. 20: 15–56. doi:10.1111/1467-9930.00041.
- Karstedt, Susanne (2001). "Comparing cultures, comparing crime: Challenges, prospects and problems for a global criminology". Crime, Law and Social Change. 36 (3): 285–308. doi:10.1023/A:1012223323445. S2CID 142783288.
- Karstedt, Susanne (2002). "Emotions and criminal justice". Theoretical Criminology. 6 (3): 299–317. doi:10.1177/136248060200600304. S2CID 53129358.
- Karstedt, Susanne (2006). "Democracy, Values, and Violence: Paradoxes, Tensions, and Comparative Advantages of Liberal Inclusion". The Annals of the American Academy of Political and Social Science. 605: 50–81. doi:10.1177/0002716206288248. S2CID 154592042.
- Karstedt, Susanne; Farrall, Stephen (2006). "The Moral Economy of Everyday Crime". The British Journal of Criminology. 46 (6): 1011–1036. doi:10.1093/bjc/azl082.
