= Richard Abel (lawyer) =

American lawyer

- Born: September 13, 1941 (age 84); New York, New York
- Occupation: Lawyer

Richard L. Abel (born September 13, 1941) is a professor of law (now emeritus), a specialist in African Law Studies and a renowned socio-legal scholar. He received his B.A. from Harvard University (1962), his LL.B. from Columbia University (1965) and his Ph.D. from the University of London (1974) where he was a Marshall Scholar. He has been a member of the faculty of the UCLA School of Law since 1974. He is a past president of the Law and Society Association and editor of the Law & Society Review.

== Selected publications ==
- "Contesting Legality in the United States After September 11", in Fighting for Political Freedom: Comparative Studies of the Legal Complex and Political Liberalism, edited by Terence Halliday, Lucien Karpik, and Malcolm Feeley (Onati International Series in Law and Society). Oxford (2008).
- English Lawyers between Market and State: The Politics of Professionalism (2003).
- Speaking Respect, Respecting Speech (1998).
- Politics by Other Means: Law in the Struggle Against Apartheid, 1980–1994 (1995);
- (edited with Philip S.C. Lewis) Lawyers in Society. An Overview. (1995).
- "Transnational Law Practice", 44 Case Western Reserve Law Review (1993), 737;
- The Politics of Informal Justice (editor, 1982).
- (with William Felstiner and Austin sarat) "The Emergence and Transformation of Disputes: Naming, Blaming, Claiming" 15 Law & Society Review, (1980), 631.
