= International Institute for the Sociology of Law =

Spanish research institute

Coordinates: 43.03379°N 2.41539°W

The International Institute for the Sociology of Law (IISL) in Oñati is the only international establishment which is entirely devoted to teaching and promoting the sociology of law, socio-legal studies, and law and society research.

The IISL is a joint venture of the Research Committee on Sociology of Law (also known as RC12 of the International Sociological Association) and the government of the Basque autonomous region in Spain. It is situated (since 1989) in the University of Oñati (the Ancient University of the Basque Country) in Oñati. The founding director of the IISL, André-Jean Arnaud, had bronze plaques put on the walls of the renaissance building with the names of some of the forefathers of modern sociology of law: Montesquieu, Henry James Sumner Maine, Francisco Giner de los Ríos, Henri Lévy-Bruhl, Achille Loria, Leon Petrażycki, Émile Durkheim, Max Weber, Eugen Ehrlich, Karl Renner, Karl N. Llewellyn, Theodor Geiger, Georges Gurvitch, Nicholas S. Timasheff.

The IISL has four "official languages": English, French, Spanish and Basque. It houses a famous library/documentation centre covering socio-legal literature in all major and many minor languages. The Institute organises socio-legal workshops and an international Master's Program in the Sociology of Law, including student scholarships. Publications from the workshops are regularly produced in both an English- and Spanish language series, including the Institute's own online peer-reviewed journal (Onati Socio-Legal Series). The IISL is also the host of the World Consortium of Law and Society associations. Applications to host a workshop, residence grants for visitors wishing to use the library, and to study on the Masters programmes are usually due mid-February.

== Literature ==
- André-Jean Arnaud, Inaugural Speech: Legal Culture and Everyday Life, Vitoria, [Oñati Proceedings, vol.1], 1989, p. 41-48.
- Pierre Guibentif (ed.) Oñati IISL-IISJ. 1989-2000: Introduction to the Institute and Report about its Activities. Oñati: IISL 2000.
- Oñati International Series in the Sociology of Law (Richard Hart Publishers, Oxford)
- Collección Oñati: Derecho y Sociedad (Dykinson: Madrid)

== See also ==
- Sociology of Law
- Research Committee on Sociology of Law
- Mavis Maclean
- Bill Felstiner
- Roberto Bergalli
- Paavo Uusitalo
