= Theodor Geiger =

German socialist, lawyer and sociologist

- Born: 9 November 1891; Munich, Germany
- Died: 16 June 1952 (aged 60); At sea between Canada and Denmark
- Occupations: Educator, publisher

Academic background
- Education: Ludwig-Maximilians-Universität München; University of Würzburg
- Thesis: Die Schutzaufsicht (1918)
- Doctoral advisor: Friedrich Oetker

Academic work
- Discipline: Sociologist
- Sub-discipline: Sociology of Law specialist
- Institutions: Aarhus University

Theodor Julius Geiger (9 November 1891 in Munich, Germany – 16 June 1952) was a German socialist, lawyer and sociologist who studied Sociology of Law, social stratification and social mobility, methodology, and intelligentsia, among other things. He was Denmark's first professor of sociology, working at Aarhus University (1938–1940).

== Life ==
Geiger grew up in Landshut, Bavaria, showing an interest in Scandinavia and a talent in Scandinavian languages from an early age. The son of a gymnasium teacher, Geiger studied law and political science, first at the Ludwig-Maximilians-Universität München from 1910 to 1912, then from 1912 to 1914 at the University of Würzburg, where he received his doctorate in law.

In 1914 Geiger voluntarily joined the army; he served until 1918 and was wounded. Simultaneously he wrote a dissertation on the supervision of criminals, Die Schutzaufsicht, supported by Friedrich Oetker. In 1918 he became a Doctor of Laws.

In 1920 Geiger joined the Social Democratic Party of Germany (SPD). In the same year he became an assistant at the Statistischer Reichsamt, the statistics office, in Munich, working in the trade statistics department from 1924 to 1933. His home, however, was in Berlin, where he published the magazine Fremde Presse (Foreign Press), with news on the Reich ministry for the army from 1920 to 1929. At the same time he edited the information magazine of the newly founded Berlin Volkshochschule (adult education centre) where he had begun to work as a teacher.

Geiger taught at Volkshochschule during a time when the institution was largely for the basic academic and cultural education of working class adults. Here he used the opportunity to focus on the social and political consequences of adult education by promoting critical thinking and intellectualism in his students. He eventually became principal but left in 1928 to take up the chair of Sociology at Brunswick Institute of Technology.

Geiger had originally joined the Braunschweig University of Technology (Brunswick) in 1924, progressing from being a visiting lecturer, to an associate professor, and finally becoming a full professor of sociology in 1929; this was the first professorship of the department for cultural studies. Geiger's work is still kept at the "Theodor Geiger Archive" at the university. He worked there until 1933, when, due to his anti-Nazi beliefs, he had to emigrate to Denmark; here he lived until 1943, even obtaining Danish citizenship. In 1939, he wrote Sociologi, which was for several decades an important textbook.

In Denmark Geiger began by gaining a scholarship from the Rockefeller Foundation through the Instituttet for Historie og Samfundskonomie in Copenhagen; later he gave lectures at the University of Copenhagen. From 1938 to 1940, he was professor of sociology at the University of Århus—Denmark's first ever professor of sociology. When German troops entered the city in 1940 he was forced to leave, escaping to Odense where he lived with his parents-in-law for the next few years. In 1943 he fled once again to Sweden where he stayed for three years. Here he gave lectures at the universities of Stockholm, Uppsala and Lund. When the war ended in 1945, Geiger immediately returned to Århus, taking up his position as professor of sociology once more. His first step was to found the university institute for research into societies, the first institute of its kind in Scandinavia.

From 1948 to 1952, Geiger published the series Nordiske Studier i Sociologie (Nordic Studies on Sociology) with Torgny Torgnysson Segerstedt, Veli Verkko and Johan Vogt. In 1949 he was a co-founder of the International Sociological Association.

On 16 June 1952, Geiger died on the return trip from Canada to Denmark on board the ship Waterman.

== Work ==
Geiger is considered the founder of the concept of social stratification, using the concept of stratification (introduced by Edward Ross) for the analysis of social structures.

According to this view, society is divided into an indefinite number of social levels or groups, defined according to attributes such as profession, education, upbringing, living standard, power, dress, religion, race, political opinion and organisation. This idea is closely connected to that of social mobility and the criteria for an industrial society.

At least in Germany, he is also seen as an important contributor to the sociology of law, by publishing, in 1947, his "Vorstudien zu einer Soziologie des Rechts" (preliminary studies for a sociology of law).

Geiger also worked on the fundamental concepts of sociology, working class education, industrial organisation, class structure, mobility, the origin and functions of the intelligentsia, critics of ideology, and the nature of modern mass-society and democracy. He also spent time studying the nature of revolutionary crowds.

Geiger analysed the institutionalisation of the class struggle, which he called democratisation, and he considered it interconnected with corporativism.

Geiger published more than 160 works, but only a few have been translated to English thus far. The Danish body of Geiger's work has been translated (commented version) to German by Gert J. Fode of the University of Aarhus, edited by Prof. Klaus Rodax (University of Erfurt, Germany).

== Methodology ==
Geiger made many significant contributions to methodology of the social sciences.

Seeing no necessary difference between the laws and methods of the natural sciences and those of the social sciences, he advocated for unity of the methodologies of all the empirical sciences. Geiger believed that sociology can only be a true scientific discipline if it establishes this consistent methodology and a rejection of the idiographic approach. Further, sociology should not study isolated instances, but rather patterns. This requires iterating between the general and the specific, by alternatively adopting catascopic and anascopic approaches.

Geiger stressed the importance of supporting inductive research with empirical data but also the importance of theory in the analysis of empirical evidence. He believed that concepts are not to be derived from observation and experience alone but must be supported by them.

The professor in Philosophy at the University of Aarhus, Svend Ranulf, at the time of Geiger's professorship there in Sociology, wrote a textbook about social science methodology, making arguments against some social scientists' methodologies. In particular, he argued against Geiger. Ranulf had been an applicant for the professorship position that Geiger was awarded in 1938. Ranulf alluded in his textbook that the methodologies of some sociologists, among them Theodor Geiger, could lead to a new Nazi movement. In 1946 Geiger wrote and published a short book, "Ranulf Contra Geiger, an Attack and an Offensive Defense". In this book, Geiger outlined very carefully what his methodologies were, emphasizing that empirical sociology is built on concepts but is a quantitative study of social processes and phenomena. He validated one point made by Ranulf, that data should be collected in a non-biased way but he also defended that concepts come prior to data collection in research, and although such concepts may need revision after collection of data is through, any data collection without a conceptual foundation is illogical. In response to Ranulf's opposition to qualitative data and interpretation, Geiger argued that these were okay for analysis as long as the researcher maintained a value-free approach.

Geiger published several articles in 1948 and 1949 about his theoretical considerations of methodology.

== Thought ==
=== Social Stratification and Mobility ===
Social stratification and social mobility were included among Geiger's main interests and within these subfields, he made several contributions to sociology. His interest in social stratification began in the 1920s when he initially accepted the Marxist definition of class. However, Geiger quickly developed his own definition of class and several theories on the subject. In his 1930 publication (On the Theory of the Class Concept and the Proletarian Class), he distinguished his view from the Marxist concept that class structure is entirely determined by ownership of the means of production. Geiger argued that the Marxist ideology of class was a decent generalization but that it was also a "type concept" and described only a partial view of reality. Further, he felt that the Marxist Two-class model was an accurate description of the earliest forms of capitalism but that modern developments did not fulfill Marx's predictions of the polarization of classes and intensified class conflict. He believed society to be dynamic, so although he agreed with Marx, he believed that there are other causes and types of stratification other than those of the narrow Marxist definition and concept. Instead, he looked at the classes of society in terms of stages, with estate society preceding the class conflict of Geiger's present, and a new stage to come in which society will form into distinct, specific social groups. He also acknowledged income, level of education, and political power as new factors for stratification. Geiger developed a complex model and typology of social stratification, which was published in Wörterbuch der Soziologie (1955). In many ways, Geiger defended Marxism but he also agreed with arguments that many predictions made by Marxist class theory were not carried out.

In 1932, Geiger wrote an analysis of the classes in Germany. The analysis was based on an empirical study of social stratification. In his analysis of the data, he classified the population into five groups, more complex than capitalists and proletariat as used by Marx, to determine the objective economic criteria of class. Here, he made the distinction between objective and subjective forms of social class analysis including objective social status and subjective class consciousness, respectively. He distinguishes the "old" middle class of farmers, artisans, and merchants from the "new" middle class of well trained professionals. Geiger saw the new salary-earning middle class as a sort of evolution of the proletarian class. He also believed that the middle class was more susceptible to new extremist ideologies like Nazism because it has a defensive and vulnerable position due to its lack of secure class identity. He elaborated on these ideas about the middle class in Klassesamfundeti Stobegryden (Class Society in the Melting Pot), after World War II. In London, Geiger and David Glass formed a subcommittee on social stratification and mobility and together they started a comparative study of international mobility and stratification.

In 1949, Geiger did an empirical study of social stratification in Aarhus. The study was conducted through the general census of Aarhus, by adding a question about father's occupation and father-in-law's occupation, in addition to asking the subject's own occupation. The participants included over 40,000 men. The study was done carefully and objectively. He took all factors and variables into account to ensure validity. Instead of looking at individual relationships for evidence in his analysis, he paid attention to group fluctuations that affected large scale changes in size and social rank of groups and instead of looking at vertical mobility, he looked at mobility between generations, throughout eighteen occupational categories. The main result of the data was a decrease in social mobility over time. In Geiger's analysis, he took these findings to reflect a period of increasing stability following a period of stratification type transition. He attributed this to the democratization of Denmark in the 1930s and 1940s that he claims led to a decrease in the need and desire for upward mobility.

=== Ideology and Value-free thought ===
Ideology to Geiger is "a concept in the theory of knowledge," or "the atheoretical taken theoretically." His actual definition of ideology was: A statement that has or is presented to have an apparent meaning, claiming to be theoretical and factual while maintaining elements that are not theoretical, objective, or empirically supported and/or valid. His theory of ideology, resting on a methodological basis, was: "That to claim objective truth from a creation of the imagination is an ideology and is invalid". Geiger was very concerned with Value Freedom, or the difference between value and fact, and the belief that Science cannot be valid when making Value-judgements. A Value-judgement is an ideological statement because it disguises a value as a statement of fact, claiming to be valid and objective. Geiger was led to these beliefs by the theories of Axel Hägerström and the Uppsala school of philosophy.

Geiger's Value Nihilism refers to his advocacy for the illegitimacy of social norms made by moral claims. Here, he stands in opposition to structural-functionalism. Value nihilism allows for value-judgements but does not allow them to become theories.

In his last work, ""Demokratie ohne Dogma"" published after his death in 1960, Geiger calls for "intellectual humanism", "enlightenment of the masses," "democratization of reason," "asceticism of emotion," and "abstinence from value judgement." He considered this last work to be his greatest political contribution.

=== Intelligentsia ===
Theodor Geiger's definition of intelligentsia is "Those who create the objects of representative culture." In this context, the word "objects" is not to be taken purely in a literal sense. Geiger saw intelligentsia as a functional term, distinct from intellectual which refers to a person that conceives of immaterial concepts and importance but who does not necessarily function to create. According to Geiger, the functions of the intelligentsia include: fueling progression, creating works of art and knowledge that serve to make life spiritual, creating applicable science with the purpose of making life rational, and criticizing power. This last function: criticism of power refers to being critical of any current or potential power structures within society, based on their possible oppression of the group's ability to create. However, they should not be confused as a revolutionary force. His theory was formulated in contrary response to Mannheim's concept of the intelligentsia as political leaders. Geiger saw the intelligentsia's function of criticism as the responsibility to destroy ideologies of the powerful, not to create ideologies of their own. But while this is not their function, according to Geiger, he acknowledges that they do it anyway. He thought that the intelligentsia should create works of art or imagination, and that they should separately support Scientific theories with empirical evidence, but that they should not combine imagination with theory in the form of ideology. The intelligentsia, as a group, do not belong to any one social class, neither objectively or subjectively speaking. In fact, Geiger categorizes them into four social classes: gentry, bourgeois, proletarian, and democratic.

After giving lectures in Sweden at Uppsala school on Intelligentsia in 1943, Geiger wrote about their position in society, their functions and their origin in 1944. This work was published in 1949. Shortly after, he returned to Denmark, where he conducted an empirical study on the origins and structure of Danish Intelligentsia, based on the Danish Biographical Encyclopedia, enabling him to study the group over a four hundred year span.

== Publications ==
- 1919 Die Schutzaufsicht. Breslau (then Germany): Schletter.
- 1920 Das uneheliche Kind und seine Mutter im Recht des neuen Staates: Ein Versuch auf der Basis kritischer Rechtsvergleichung. Munich: Schweitzer.
- 1926 Die Masse und ihre Aktion: Ein Beitrag zur Soziologie der Revolutionen. Stuttgart (Germany): Enke.
- 1927 "Die Gruppe und die Kategorien Gemeinschaft und Gesellschaft." Archiv für Sozialwissenschaft und Sozialpolitik 58:338–374.
- 1928 Die Gestalten der Gesellung. Karlsruhe (Germany): Braun.
- (1931a) 1959 "Führung." Pages 136-141 in Handwörterbuch der Soziologie. New ed. Stuttgart (Germany):Enke.
- (1931b) 1959 "Gemeinschaft." Pages 173-180 in Handwörterbuch der Soziologie. New ed. Stuttgart (Ger many): Enke.
- (1931c) 1959 "Gesellschaft." Pages 201-211 in Handwörterbuch der Soziologie. New ed. Stuttgart (Germany):Enke.
- (1931d) 1959 "Revolution." Pages 511-518 in Handwörterbuch der Soziologie. New ed. Stuttgart (Germany):Enke.
- (1931e) 1959 "Soziologie." Pages 568-578 in Handwörterbuch der Soziologie. New ed. Stuttgart (Germany):Enke.
- 1932 Die soziale Schichtung des deutschen Volkes: Soziographischer Versuch auf statistischer Grundlage. Stuttgart (Germany): Enke.
- 1933a "Soziale Gliederung der deutschen Arbeitnehmer." Archiv für Sozialwissenschaft und Sozialpolitik 68:151–188.
- 1933b "Statistische Analyse der wirtschaftlich Selbständigen." Archiv für Sozialwissenschaft und Sozialpolitik 69:407–439.
- 1934 Erbpflege: Grundlagen, Planung, Grenzen. Stuttgart (Germany): Enke.
- 1935 Samfund og arvelighed: En sociologisk unders0gelse. Copenhagen: Martin.
- 1939 Sociologi: Grundrids og hovedproblemer. Copenhagen: Nyt Nordisk Forlag.
- 1941 "Konkurrence: En sociologisk analyse." Aarhus, Universitet, Acta jutlandica, Aarsskrift, Vol. 13, no. 2. Aarhus (Denmark): Universitets Forlaget.
- 1943 Kritik af reklamen. Copenhagen: Nyt Nordisk Forlag.
- (1944) 1949 Aufgaben und Stellung der Intelligenz in der Gesellschaft. Stuttgart (Germany): Enke. → First published as Intelligensen.
- 1946a Debat med Uppsala om moral og ret. Copenhagen: Munksgaard.
- 1946b Ranulf contra Geiger: Et angreb og et offensivt forsvar. Copenhagen: Nyt Nordisk Forlag.
- (1947) 1964 Vorstudien zu einer Soziologie des Rechts. Aarhus, Universitet, Acta jutlandica, Aarsskrift, Vol. 19, no. 1. Neuwied (Germany): Luchterhand.
- (1948) 1949 Die Klassengesellschaft in Schmelztiegel. Cologne (Germany): Kiepenheuer. →First published in Danish.
- 1949 Den Danske intelligens fra reformationen til nuti-den: En studie i empirisk kultursociologi. Aarhus, Universitet, Acta jutlandica, Aarsskrift, Vol. 21, no. 1. Aarhus (Denmark): Universitets Forlaget.
- 1951α "Die Legende von der Massengesellschaft." Archiv für Rechts- und Sozialphilosophie 39:305–323.
- 1951b Soziale Umschichtungen in einer dänischen Mittelstadt. Aarhus, Universitet, Acta jutlandica, Aarsskrift, Vol. 23, no. 1. Aarhus (Denmark): Universitets For laget.
- 1952 Fortidens moral og fremtidens. Copenhagen: Reitzel.
- 1953 Ideologie und Wahrheit: Eine soziologische Kritik des Denkens. Stuttgart (Germany) and Vienna: Humboldt. → Published posthumously.
- 1954α "Intelligenz." Volume 5, pages 302-304 in Handwörterbuch der Sozialwissenschaften. Stuttgart (Germany): Fischer. → Published posthumously.
- 1954b "Ideologie." Volume 5, pages 179-184 in Handwörterbuch der Sozialwissenschaften. Stuttgart (Germany): Fischer. → Published posthumously.
- (1955) 1962 "Theorie der sozialen Schichtung." Pages 186–205 in Theodor Geiger, Arbeiten zur Soziologie: Methode, moderne Grossgesellschaft, Rechtssoziologie, ldeologiekritik. Neuwied (Germany): Luchterhand. → Published posthumously. Originally appeared in the Wörterbuch der Soziologie, edited by W. Bernsdorf and F. Bülow.
- (1960) 1963 Demokratie ohne Dogma: Die Gesellschaft zwischen Pathos und Nüchternheit. Munich: Szczesny. → First published posthumously as Die Gesellschaft zwischen Pathos und Nüchternheit.
- Arbeiten zur Soziologie: Methode, moderne Grossgesellschaft, Rechtssoziologie, Ideologiekritik. Neuwied (Germany): Luchterhand, 1962.

== See also ==
- Social stratification
