= David Nelken =

British political scientist

David Nelken is a Distinguished Professor of Legal Institutions and Social Change (Professore Ordinario, di chiara fama) Faculty of Political Science, University of Macerata and the Distinguished Visiting Research Professor, Faculty of Law, Cardiff University. His work focuses primarily on comparative criminal justice and comparative sociology of law. He was elected a Fellow of the British Academy in 2023.

== Selected publications ==
=== Monographs ===
- Comparative Criminal Justice: Making Sense of Difference, Sage, 2010
- Beyond Law in Context: Developing a Sociological Understanding of Law, Ashgate, 2009, ISBN 978-0-7546-2802-6
- The Limits of the Legal Process. A Study of Landlords, Law and Crime, Academic Press, 1983

=== Edited volumes ===
- Comparative Criminal Justice and Globalization, edited, Ashgate, 2011
- European Ways of Law: Towards a European Sociology of Law, edited with Volkmar Gessner, Hart Publishing, 2007
- Explorations in Legal Cultures, edited with Fred Bruinsma, Elsevier, 2007
- Law's New Boundaries: The consequences of Legal Autopoiesis, edited with Jiří Přibáň, Ashgate Publishing, Aldershot, 2001, ISBN 0-7546-2202-9
- Adapting Legal Cultures, edited with Johannes Feest, Hart Publishing, Oxford, 2001, ISBN 1-84113-291-8
- Contrasting Criminal Justice: Getting from Here to There, edited, Ashgate, 2000
- Comparing Legal Cultures, edited, Dartmouth 1997, Nelken D, Tsinghua university Press, Peking, China (2003) ISBN 7-302-07249-3.
- Italian Politics: The Center-Left in Power, edited with Roberto D'Alimonte, Westview, 1997
- The Futures of Criminology, edited, Sage, 1994
