= Deborah Hensler =

American academic and researcher (born 1942)

Deborah R. Hensler (born 1942) is an American academic and researcher, currently the Judge John W. Ford Professor of Dispute Resolution at Stanford Law School. Hensler holds a Ph.D in political science from the Massachusetts Institute of Technology and an honorary doctorate by Leuphana University.
