= Law & Society Review =

- Language: English

Publication details
- History: 1966–present
- Publisher: Cambridge University Press on behalf of the Law and Society Association
- Frequency: Quarterly

Standard abbreviations
- Bluebook: Law & Soc'y Rev.
- ISO 4: Law Soc. Rev.

Indexing
- ISSN: 0023-9216 (print); 1540-5893 (web)
- LCCN: 87647377
- JSTOR: 00239216
- OCLC no.: 50059353

Links
- Journal homepage; Online access; Online archive

Law & Society Review (abbreviated LSR) is a peer-reviewed journal in the academic field of law and society. It was established by the Law and Society Association in 1966 and is published by Cambridge University Press. Prior to 2024, it was published by Wiley-Blackwell. LSR has four issues per volume per year and is regarded by sociolegal scholars worldwide as a leading journal in the sociology of law. The general editors are Lee Cabatingan (University of California, Irvine, US), Bill Maurer (University of California, Irvine, US), and Justin Richland (University of California, Irvine, US).

== Abstracting and indexing ==
Law & Society Review is abstracted and indexed in the Social Sciences Citation Index. According to the Journal Citation Reports, the journal has a 2024 impact factor of 2.1, ranking it 41st out of 444 in the category "Law" and 54th out of 220 journals in the category "Sociology".
