= Georges Gurvitch =

French sociologist (1894–1965)

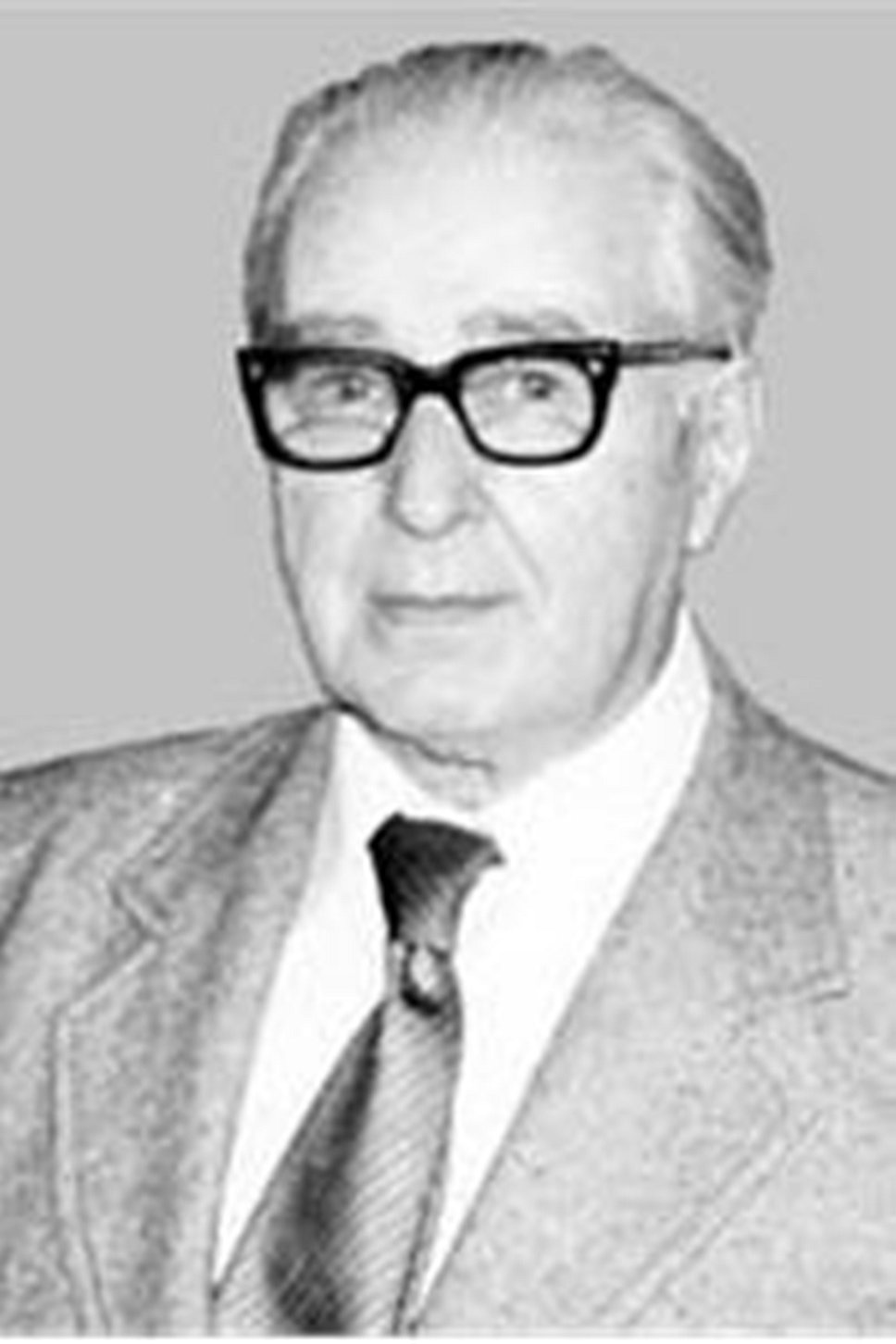
Georges Gurvitch

Georges Gurvitch (Russian: Георгий Давидович Гурвич; October 20, 1894, Novorossiysk – December 12, 1965, Paris) was a Russian-born French sociologist and jurist.

== Career ==
One of the leading sociologists of his time, he was a specialist in the sociology of knowledge. In 1944 he founded the journal Cahiers internationaux de Sociologie. He held a chair in sociology at the Sorbonne in Paris. An outspoken advocate of Algerian decolonization, Gurvitch and his wife were the victim of a terrorist attack by the far-right nationalist group the O.A.S. on 22 June 1962. Their apartment was destroyed by a bomb, and they took refuge for a time at the house of painter Marc Chagall.

Gurvitch is an important figure in the development of sociology of law. Like other legal sociologists, he insisted that law is not merely the rules or decisions produced, interpreted and enforced by agencies of the state, such as legislatures, courts and police. Groups and communities of various kinds, whether formally structured or informally organised, produce regulation for themselves and others, which can properly be considered law from a sociological standpoint. Gurvitch's legal pluralism is, however, far more rigorous and radical than that of most legal sociologists and locates an immense variety of types of law in the various kinds of sociality—or social interaction—that he distinguished in his writings. He saw the need to stress the reality and significance of social law and social rights, in opposition to what he termed individual law. His Bill of Social Rights, drafted at the end of World War II was an attempt to state a blueprint of a legal framework of social law for a postwar world in which the idea of human rights had become newly powerful.

The sociologist and ideologue of the 1979 Iranian revolution Ali Shariati studied under Gurvitch in the 1960s during his studies in France at the University of Sorbonne.

== Works ==
- Rousseau and the Bill of Rights (1918) (originally published in Russian as «Руссо и Декларация прав»)
- Essais de Sociologie (1939)
- Sociology of law (1942)
- The Bill of Social Rights (1945)
- La vocation actuelle de la sociologie (1950)
- Le concept des classes sociales de Marx à nos jours (1954)
- The Spectrum of Social Time (1958)
- Dialectique et sociologie (1962)
- The Social Frameworks of Knowledge (1972)
