= Cardiff School of Law and Politics =

School that is part of Cardiff University

Cardiff Law School Ysgol y Gyfraith Caerdydd
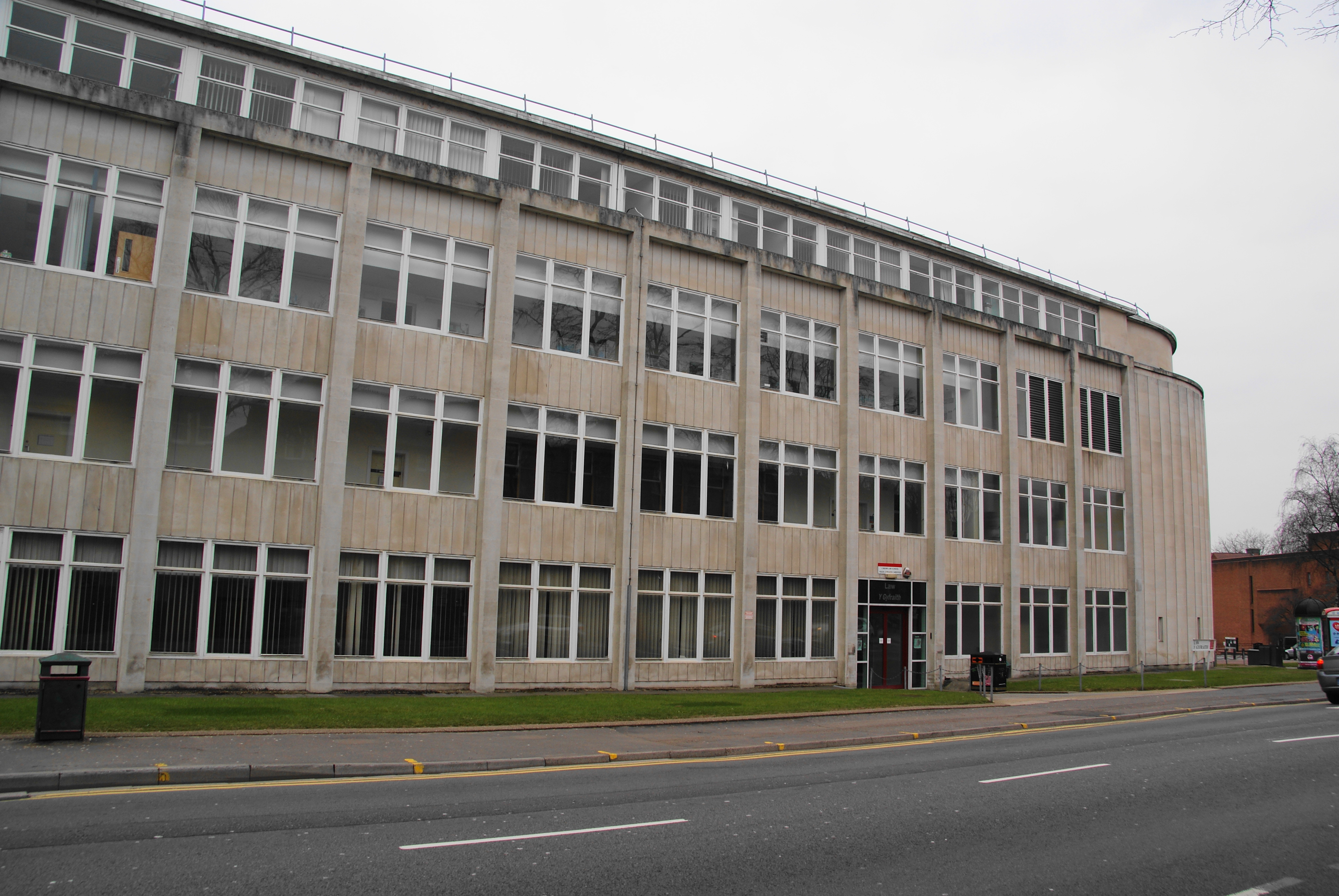
- Type: Law school
- Established: 1893
- Affiliations: University of Cardiff
- Head: Professor Urfan Khaliq
- Administrative staff: 156
- Location: Cardiff, Wales; 51.4892°N 3.1817°W
Colours
- Website: www.cardiff.ac.uk/law-politics

Cardiff School of Law and Politics (Welsh: Ysgol y Gyfraith a Gwleidyddiaeth Caerdydd), also known as Cardiff Law School (Welsh: Ysgol Y Gyfraith Caerdydd) is part of Cardiff University in Cardiff, Wales. It confers LLB and LLM degrees for British and international students.

== Background ==
In 1963, the Law Building (previously known as the Arts Building) opened, facing onto Museum Avenue and Park Place in Cardiff. The law school is attended by students from various countries. It provides a range of undergraduate law courses, all of which train students to complete the foundation modules that constitute the academic stage of training necessary to become a solicitor or barrister. It also offers postgraduate LLM courses, criminal law courses and research degrees for those who want to study an aspect of law at a more in-depth level.

Academically, Cardiff Law School offers Bar Professional Training Course and legal practice courses. Both of these courses have received the Bar Standard Board's highest ratings. The law school offers courses for full-time, part-time and distance learning students. Cardiff Law School also provides many extra-curricular opportunities by having a close partnership with lawyers and other law-related organisations. The school also has law career advisers that organise programs, presentations and advisory sessions for students needing employment or career help.

== Academics ==
Cardiff Law School offers a legal training package. These packages are offered to students who are starting their career in legal studies and qualified practitioners who are seeking a career in law. Cardiff is the only university that offers all professional law courses such as: Graduate diploma in law (GDL), Legal practice course (LPC), and Bar Professional Training Course (BPTC). The school offers many undergraduate programs such as LLB law with criminology, political science, sociology, French, German and Welsh. For postgraduate students from UK and overseas, the school offers courses in human rights, international law, social care, commercial law and many other courses related to the field of law. Professional courses in law are also offered that can lead to master's or PhD in law and legal studies. Cardiff Law School also provides a CPD (Continuing Professional Development) programme for professionals who have already completed their careers and wish to go further in their education that is not specifically related to law. These students can choose to receive one LLM unit or obtain full LLM units and earn a full LLM degree. The school's CDP modules are accredited by the Bar Standards Council and the Solicitors Regulation Authority.

== Alumni ==
- Gawain Briars
- David Campbell (legal academic)
- Alex Davies-Jones
- Edward Enoch Jenkins
- Amira Elmissiry
- Raymond Gower
- John Warwick Montgomery
- Jonathan Morgan (politician)
- Kate Muir
- Megan Pullum
- M Ravi
- Michael Shrimpton
- Zheng Zeguang
- Vaughan Gething

== Facilities and services ==
There are various facilities and services available to students to support and guide them through their school life. The school offers a large library with over 3,000 study spaces, free Wi-Fi access and over 1.3 million books. The library is open throughout the week for students to use. They also provide 60 different sport clubs, including water sports for students to participate in. They provide computing services across campuses so students can use a computer anytime they feel the need to. Religious provision and student support are also arranged.

== Research ==
The law school has been recognised as a leading centre of research. In the 2008 Research Assessment Exercise, the school was recognised as a leading legal research institution and was ranked seventh out of 100 schools in the United Kingdom for their outstanding legal research institute. They have also received topgrading in 1996, where they were known for their vibrant research culture. The school's research is broken down into four different groups: Procedural Justice, Regulation of Commercial Activity, Medicine, Health care and Society and Governance & Constitutionalism.
