= Nicholas Timasheff =

Russian sociologist, professor of jurisprudence and writer

Nicholas Sergeyevitch Timasheff (Russian: Никола́й Серге́евич Тима́шев; November 9, 1886 – March 9, 1970) was a Russian sociologist, professor of jurisprudence and writer.

== Biography ==
Timasheff "came from an old family of Russian nobility"; his father was Minister of Trade and Industry under Nicholas II. In St. Petersburg, where he was born, he attended a classical high school; he went on to attend the Tsarskoye Selo Lyceum, the University of Strasbourg, and the Saint Petersburg State University (MA 1910, LLD 1914). At the latter university he met the Polish-Russian jurist Leon Petrazycki, who was a significant influence on him throughout his life. Two years later he began teaching sociological jurisprudence at the University of Petrograd. He emigrated to the United States following an alleged involvement with the Tagantsev conspiracy in 1921. He joined the Harvard University Sociology Department, chaired at that time by Pitirim Sorokin, and later transitioned to sociology faculty of Fordham University, where he would remain for the rest of his career.

Timasheff was the author of various works, including The Great Retreat: The Growth and Decline of Communism in Russia (New York, 1946), in which he argued that the Bolsheviks made a conscious retreat from socialist values during the 1930s, instead returning to traditional ones like patriotism and the family. Historian Terry Martin considers this a misnomer, because "in the political and economic spheres, the period after 1933 marked a consolidation, rather than a repudiation, of the most important goals of Stalin's socialist offensive: forced industrialization, collectivization, nationalization, abolition of the market, political dictatorship."

Timasheff died in New York on 9 March 1970. He was buried at Oakland Cemetery (Yonkers, New York) in Westchester County.

== Sources ==
- Roman Goul, "N. S. Timasheff 1886-1970," Russian Review 29 no. 3 (July, 1970): 363-365.
