= Eugen Ehrlich =

Austrian lawyer (1862–1922)

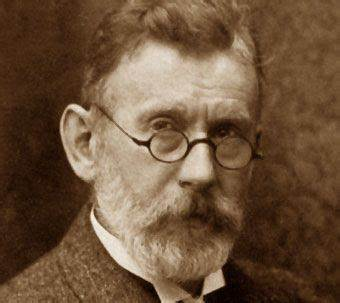
- Born: 14 September 1862; Czernowitz, Bukovina, Austrian Empire
- Died: 2 May 1922 (aged 59); Vienna, Austria
- Occupation: Jurist
- Website: www.eugen-ehrlich.com

Eugen Ehrlich (14 September 1862 – 2 May 1922) was an Austrian legal scholar and sociologist of law. He is widely regarded as one of the primary founders of the modern field of sociology of law.

== Biography ==
Ehrlich was born in Czernowitz (now Chernivtsi) in the Duchy of Bukovina, at that time a province of the Austrian Empire. Ehrlich studied law in Lemberg, then in Vienna, where he taught and practised as a lawyer before returning to Czernowitz to teach at the university there, a bastion of Germanic culture at the eastern edge of the Empire.

Ehrlich remained there for the rest of his teaching career and was Rector of the University in 1906–7. During the turmoil of World War I, when Czernowitz was occupied several times by Russian forces, he moved to Switzerland. After the break-up of the Austro-Hungarian Empire and the ceding of the Bukovina to Romania, Ehrlich planned to return to Czernowitz, where he would have been required to teach in Romanian, but he died of diabetes in Vienna, Austria in 1922.

== Career ==
Ehrlich's experience of the Bukovina's legal culture, where Austrian law and sharply contrasting local custom seemed to co-exist, caused him to question the hierarchical notions of law propounded by such theorists as his fellow countryman, the jurist Hans Kelsen. Ehrlich noted that legal theories that recognized law only as a sum of statutes and court decisions gave an inadequate view of the legal reality of a community. Law, if understood sociologically, embraces much more than just state legislation and court decisions. He drew a distinction between norms for decision (Entscheidungsnormen) and social norms or norms of conduct (Lebendes Recht). The latter are created in the social interaction of people. They are rules that make everyday social association possible and stable. Such rules actually govern the life of a society and, under certain conditions, the most important of them can justifiably be regarded in popular consciousness, if not necessarily by lawyers, as law. In addition, these social norms, or "living law", as Ehrlich called them, are frequently adopted and incorporated in state law. For example, commercial usage and custom may develop and be recognized and respected by courts of law and other agencies as having normative force and legal significance.

Ehrlich claimed that the living law that regulates social life may be very different from the norms for decision applied by courts, and may sometimes attract far greater cultural authority which lawyers cannot safely ignore. Norms for decision regulate only those disputes that are brought before a judicial or other tribunal. Living law is a necessary framework for the routine structuring of social relationships. Its source is in the many different kinds of social associations in which people co-exist. Its essence is not dispute and litigation, but peace and co-operation. What counts as law (again, from a sociological perspective) depends on what kind of authority exists to give it legal significance among those it is supposed to regulate.

Ehrlich's teaching is that the sources of law's authority are plural. Some sources are political and others are cultural. As such, political and cultural sources may conflict. But not all social norms should be thought of as 'law', in Ehrlich's view. Legal norms (again, understood sociologically, rather than juristically) are typically distinguished from merely moral or customary ones by powerful feelings of revulsion which typically attach to breach of them. They are, thus, regarded as socially fundamental. In addition, legal norms are recognisable as such because they concern certain kinds of relationships, transactions and circumstances which he described as 'facts of the law' (Tatsachen des Rechts) — specially important topics or considerations for social regulation.

Following the union of Bukovina with Romania, Ehrlich — a native German speaker — initially attempted to secure a professorship in Zurich, but was unsuccessful. Consequently, he returned to Bukovina in 1920, seeking to reclaim his chair. The rector at the time, Ion Nistor, opposed his return, arguing that Ehrlich had forfeited his position in 1919 when he failed to respond to an invitation to teach in Cernăuți. In 1921, Ehrlich moved to Bucharest to seek professional support. He found allies in Dimitrie Gusti and, most notably, Nicolae Iorga. Ehrlich collaborated with Iorga at the summer university in Vălenii de Munte, and Iorga eventually helped him secure an audience with King Ferdinand. Furthermore, Iorga invited him to deliver a series of lectures (in French) at the Romanian Athenaeum regarding Living Law. These lectures were later translated into Romanian and published in Neamul Românesc.

By late 1921, Ehrlich was finally appointed as the chair of the Philosophy of Law and Sociology, a position created specifically for him. He was granted a two-semester leave of absence to prepare his courses in the Romanian language. During this period, he also published a 47-page work dedicated to the collapse of the Austria-Hungary. Ultimately, Ehrlich never had the chance to teach at the university again. Suffering from severe diabetes, he traveled to Vienna for treatment at the beginning of 1922. He died there on 2 May 1922.

== See also ==
- Hugo Sinzheimer
- Otto von Gierke
- Otto Kahn-Freund
- Karl Marx
