= Law and Society Association =

Group of scholars

- Abbreviation: LSA
- Formation: 1964
- Founded at: University of Massachusetts, Amherst
- Location: University of Massachusetts, Amherst
- Website: www.lawandsociety.org

The Law and Society Association (LSA), founded in 1964, is a group of scholars from many fields and countries who share a common interest in the place of law in social, political, economic and cultural life. It is one of the leading professional associations for those interested in the sociology of law.

== Overview ==
LSA members bring expertise in law, sociology, political science, psychology, anthropology, economics, history, and geography as well as in other related areas to the study of sociolegal phenomena.

Among its activities, the Association publishes the Law & Society Review, sponsors annual conferences and educational workshops, and fosters the development of academic programs in law and society around the world.

The LSA's executive office is located in the University of Massachusetts, Amherst.

== Annual meetings ==
- 2007: Berlin, Germany (July 25–28)
- 2008: Montreal, Quebec (May 29-June 1)
- 2009: Denver, Colorado (May 28–31)
- 2010: Chicago, Illinois (May 27–30)
- 2011: San Francisco, California (June 2–5)
- 2012: Honolulu, Hawaii (June 5–8)
- 2013: Boston, Massachusetts (May 30-June 2)
- 2014: Minneapolis, Minnesota (May 29 - June 1)
- 2015: Seattle, Washington (May 28–31)
- 2016: New Orleans, Louisiana (June 2–5)
- 2017: Mexico City, Mexico (June 20–23)
- 2018: Toronto, Canada (June 7–10)
- 2019: Washington, DC (May 30 – June 2)
- 2020: Virtual (May 27- 31)
- 2021: Virtual (May 26-31)
- 2022: Lisbon, Portugal (July 13-16)
- 2023: San Juan, Puerto Rico (June 1-4)
- 2024: Denver, Colorado (June 6-9)
- 2025: Chicago, Illinois (May 22-25)
- 2026: San Francisco, California (May 28-31)

== Law and Society Association Prizes ==
The Association awards several prizes annually. The Harry J. Kalven, Jr. Prize, the Herbert Jacob Book Prize, the James Willard Hurst Prize, the John Hope Franklin Prize, and the Law and Society Association International Prize are among them.

=== Law and Society Association International Prize ===
This prize is offered to a scholar (typically residing outside of the U.S.) who made significant contributions to the advancement of knowledge in the field of law and society. Past recipients of the award include:

- 2001: Neelan Tiruchelvam (posthumously)
- 2003: Masaji Chiba
- 2005: Hazel Genn
- 2007: Xingliang Chen
- 2007: Dario Melossi
- 2009: Yves Dezelay
- 2012: Upendra Baxi
- 2013: David Nelken
- 2014: Setsuo Miyazawa
- 2015: Ronen Shamir
- 2016: Susanne Karstedt
- 2017: Nachman Ben-Yehuda
- 2017: John Braithwaite
- 2018: Fiona Haines
- 2019: Kelly Hannah-Moffat
- 2020: Ulrike Schultz
- 2021: Rachel Sieder
- 2022: Nicola Lacey
- 2023: Sharyn Roach Anleu
- 2024: Lynette J. Chua
