= Adam Podgórecki =

Sociologist

Adam Podgórecki (1925–1998) was a sociologist and one of the founders of the Research Committee on Sociology of Law. Podgórecki was also one of the founders of the first institute at Warsaw University which was devoted to the social scientific studies of law. He moved to Carlton University in Ottawa, Canada, and took up a Chair in sociology and anthropology, when the communists expelled him from his professorship for "anti-communist academic activities". "He worked tirelessly and fearlessly" to ensure the independence of the sociology of law "against the pull of the large disciplines of sociology on the one side and law on the other" and became one of the pioneers of the sociology of law after World War II.

He carried out a systematic programme of socio-legal research throughout his academic life, wrote and published widely in both Polish and English and developed a unique socio-legal line of inquiry which can be traced back to Leon Petrazycki’s theory of "intuitive law". According to Adam Czarnota, Podgórecki developed his social theory "in opposition to the Marxist theory of law and the state. He stressed the importance of empirical comparative material guided by theoretical hypothesis. Crucial for him was the typology, derived from Petrazycki, of intuitive and official law".

To honour the significant contribution made by Adam Podgórecki to the development of sociology of law and to shape the history of the Research Committee on Sociology of Law, its board decided in 2004 to establish the annual Adam Podgórecki Prize. It is awarded for outstanding achievements in socio-legal research.
