= Krischan =

Krischan and similar are surnames deriving from a German dialect of the word Christian or Christ. Alternative spellings include Krisch, Krische, Krischer, Krischmann, Krizan, Krischon and Krishan. The Krischan surname is German in origin. The name is also used as a first name mostly in German speaking countries serving as a variant of the more common first name Christian. It is also speculated that the name is largely east German in origin considering the likelihood of Slavic influence in the spelling. Much of eastern Germany throughout history was at one point or another settled by Slavic tribes and the influence of Slavic languages becomes evident in various personal, place and surnames of the region.

== People with the surname ==
- Dizzy Krisch (born 1954), German jazz musician
- Jacob Krisch, American football player for 2014 Minnesota Golden Gophers football team
- Johannes Krisch (1966-Present), Austrian actor
- Kevin Krisch, Austrian footballer for First Vienna FC
- Jean Krisch (born 1939), American physicist
- Lars Krisch (born 1974), German rower
- Nico Krisch (1972-Present), European legal scholar, specializing in international law, constitutional theory, and global governance
- Friedrich Krischan (1920–2007), Austrian cross country skier
- Jakob Krischan (1894–1970), Austrian politician
- Thomas Krischan, American video Game Developer who created Valley of the Kings (video game) for Atari.
- Mircea Krishan (1924–2013), German-Romanian actor
- Joseph Krische Former U.S. National Team Soccer Defender
- Michael J. Krische (born 1966), American Chemist of Gottschee German descent.
- Oliver Krischer (1969-Present), German politician

== German Naval Ships ==
- Krischan der Große: anti-aircraft vessel
- Krischan II (from 1936 Gunther Plüschow): air control ship
- Krischan III (from 1936 Bernhard von Tschirschk): air control ship
- Krischan: air control ship

== See also ==
- Krieschwej, a commune in Cluj County, Transylvania.
- Krischwitz
- Kříše (German: Krisch), a former Czech village in what is now Břasy
- Krisch, a page for this stand alone surname without related names.
