= Bryan Turner (sociologist) =

British, Australian, Singaporean, and American sociologist (born 1945)

- Born: Bryan Stanley Turner; 16 January 1945 (age 81); Birmingham, United Kingdom
- Occupation: Sociologist
- Title: Presidential Professor emeritus

Academic background
- Education: University of Leeds
- Thesis: The Decline of Methodism (1970)

Academic work
- Discipline: Sociology
- Sub-discipline: Sociology of religion

Bryan Stanley Turner (born 16 January 1945) is a British, Australian, Singaporean, and American sociologist. He is particularly known for his work on the sociology of religion, on Max Weber, and in comparative sociology, and he is Presidential Professor emeritus at The Graduate Center, City University of New York. He was a founding editor of the journals Body & Society, Citizenship Studies, and the Journal of Classical Sociology.

== Early life and education ==
Bryan Stanley Turner was born on 16 January 1945 in Birmingham, England. Turner attended Harborne Collegiate School for Boys and George Dixon Grammar School.

He went on to the University of Leeds, where he completed a first class honours degree in sociology in 1966. He received his PhD at the University of Leeds in 1970 with a thesis titled "The Decline of Methodism: an analysis of religious commitment and organisation" and supervised by A. P. M. Coxon and R. Towler.

== Career ==
Professor Turner's research interests include sociological theory, sociology of globalisation and religion, concentrating on such issues as religious conflict and the modern state, religious authority and electronic information, religious consumerism and youth cultures, human rights and religion, the human body, medical change, and religious cosmologies.

Turner wrote his first book Weber and Islam in 1974 and has since established an international reputation for his work on religion, Max Weber and comparative sociology. He was a founding editor of the journals Body & Society (with Mike Featherstone), Citizenship Studies, and the Journal of Classical Sociology (with John O'Neill). He is also an editorial member of numerous journals including The British Journal of Sociology, the European Journal of Social Theory, Contemporary Islam and the Journal of Human Rights. He is the editor of two book series for Anthem Press: Key Issues in Modern Sociology and Tracts for Our Times; he is also editor of the series Religion in Contemporary Asia for Routledge.

Turner has held university appointments in England, Scotland, Australia, Germany, Holland, Singapore and the United States. He was a dean of the faculty of the arts at Deakin University. He was a professor of sociology at the University of Cambridge (1998–2005) and research team leader for the Religion Cluster at the Asian Research Institute, National University of Singapore (2005–2008). From 2009, he was professor of social and political thought at Western Sydney University as well as a visiting professor at Wellesley College. In 2010, he left the Wellesley position to become Presidential Professor of Sociology and Director of the Religion Committee at The Graduate Center at the City University of New York (CUNY). In 2015, he was still at CUNY and was also professor of the sociology of religion at and director of the Institute for Religion, Politics and Society at the Australian Catholic University.

He has also been a faculty associate of the Center for Cultural Sociology at Yale University, a research associate of GEMASS at the Centre National de la Recherche Scientifique, a fellow of the Academy of the Social Sciences in Australia in 1987, a Member of the American Sociological Research Association, president of The Australian Sociological Association 1995–1996, and a distinguished honorary fellow of the Edward Cadbury Center at the University of Birmingham.

Turner has received several honorary degrees recognising his contributions to sociology: a Doctor of Letters at Flinders University in 1987, Master of Arts at the University of Cambridge in 2002, and Doctor of Letters at the University of Cambridge in 2009.

== Professional recognition ==
Years	Award or Recognition
1981	Morris Ginsberg Fellow, London School of Economics, University of London.
1987	Fellow of the Australian Academy of Social Sciences
1987–1988	Alexander von Humboldt Professorial Fellow, University of Bielefeld, Germany.
1995	Distinguished Visiting Professor, University of Helsinki, Finland.
2002–2005	Fellow, Fitzwilliam College, Cambridge, UK.
2009	Member, American Sociological Research Association.
2009–2010	Alona Evans Distinguished Visiting Professor of Sociology at Wellesley College
2011	Honorary Fellow of the Albanian Academy of Arts and Sciences
2015	Max Planck Research Award

== Selected bibliography ==
Year	Monographs
1974	Weber and Islam. London: Routledge & Kegan Paul Ltd.
1978	Marx and the End of Orientalism
1994	Orientalism, Postmodernism and Globalism. London: Routledge.
2004	The New Medical Sociology. New York: Norton.
2006	Vulnerability and Human Rights. Penn State University Press
2008	Rights and Virtues. Political Essays on Citizenship and Social Justice. Oxford: Bardwell Press
2008	Body and Society. Explorations in Social Theory. London: Sage (third revised edition)
2009	Can we live forever? A sociological and moral inquiry. London: Anthem Press.
2011	Religion and Modern Society. Citizenship, Secularisation and the State. Cambridge: Cambridge University Press.
Year	Edited
1990	Theories of Modernity and Postmodernity. London: SAGE Publications.
2006	The Cambridge Dictionary of Sociology. Cambridge: Cambridge University Press.
2009	The New Blackwell Companion to Social Theory. Oxford: Blackwell-Wiley.
2009	The Routledge International Handbook of Globalization Studies. London: Routledge.
2010	The New Blackwell Companion to the Sociology of Religion. Oxford: Wiley-Blackwell.
2010	Secularization. (Four-Volume Set). UK: SAGE.
2013	The Sociology of Islam: Collected Essays of Bryan S. Turner. (with Kamaludeen Mohamed Nasir). UK: Ashgate.
Year	Joint Authored Monographs
2002	June Edmunds and Bryan Turner. Generations, Culture and Society. UK: Open University Press.
2010	Kamaludeen Mohamed Nasir, Alexius Pereira and Bryan Turner. Muslims in Singapore: Piety, Politics and Policies. Routledge: London.
2010	Bryan Turner and Habibul Khondker. Globalization East and West. SAGE: London.
2014	Kamaludeen Mohamed Nasir and Bryan Turner. The Future of Singapore: Population, Society and the Nature of the State. Routledge: London.
