= Krisch =

Krisch is a surname. Notable people with this name include:

- Dizzy Krisch (born 1954), German jazz musician
- Jacob Krisch, American football player for 2014 Minnesota Golden Gophers football team
- Kevin Krisch, Austrian footballer for First Vienna FC
- Jean Krisch (born 1939), American physicist
- Johannes Krisch (born 1966), Austrian actor
- Lars Krisch (born 1974), German rower
- Nico Krisch (born 1972), German legal scholar

== See also ==
- Kříše (German: Krisch), a former Czech village in what is now Břasy
- Krish (disambiguation)
- Krischan Related surname of German origin.
