= Donald N. Levine =

American sociologist (1931–2015)

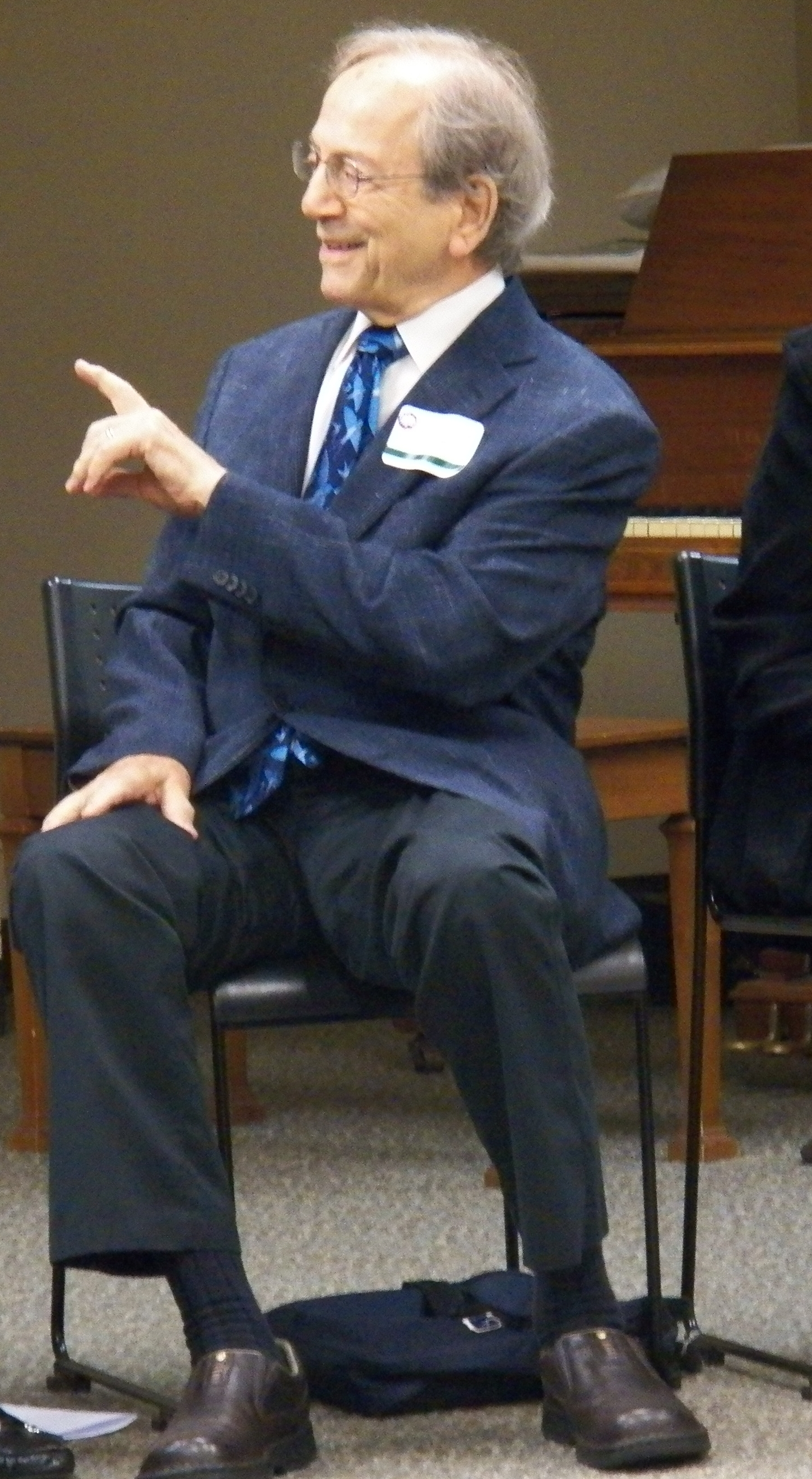
- Levine in 2013
- Born: Donald Nathan Levine; June 16, 1931; New Castle, Pennsylvania, U.S.
- Died: April 4, 2015 (aged 83)
- Education: University of Chicago
- Known for: Contributions to Sociology, Sociological theory, Ethiopian Studies
- Scientific career
- Workplaces: University of Chicago
- Academic advisors: Robert Redfield, Richard McKeon
- Notable students: Andrew Abbott, Benjamin Cornwell, Craig A. Cunningham, Daniel Kimmel, Adam Kissel

Donald Nathan Levine (June 16, 1931 – April 4, 2015) was an American sociologist, educator, social theorist and writer at the University of Chicago, where he served as Dean of the college. Within sociology, he is perhaps best known for his work in sociological theory and his translations and interpretations of Georg Simmel's classical texts into English, which led to a resurgence of interest in Simmel's work in the discipline. He was also a central figure in Ethiopian Studies.

== Biography ==
Levine was born in New Castle, Pennsylvania in 1931. He attended the University of Chicago. There, he earned a BA in 1950, MA in 1954, and PhD in 1957. His intellectual development was greatly shaped by the teachers and curriculum of the "Hutchins College" at Chicago. As a graduate student, Levine's mentors included Robert Redfield and Richard McKeon. He also spent a formative year in Germany in 1952–1953 as the university's first exchange student at the Goethe University of Frankfurt. Except for five years abroad, Levine lived in Chicago ever since receiving his doctorate in sociology. His dissertation focused on a comparison of the works of Georg Simmel and Talcott Parsons. During his postdoctoral fellowship, he spent three years in Ethiopia, which included teaching courses at University College of Addis Ababa.

He joined the faculty at the University of Chicago in 1962 and started a program on African civilization. Over time, he served as a professor of Sociology there, and its dean of undergraduate college. He later held the Peter B. Ritzma chair in Sociology (Professor Emeritus) at the university. Levine died on April 4, 2015.

== Career ==
Throughout his career, Levine remained engaged with four primary areas of work: undergraduate education, sociological theory, Ethiopian Studies, and the Japanese martial art of aikido.

Levine made distinctive contributions to the teaching of undergraduates throughout five decades of service at the University of Chicago. As chair of the staff of the Social Sciences 121-2-3 sequence in the 1960s, he reorganized the yearlong course into its current form as Self, Culture & Society. As founding Master of the Social Sciences Collegiate Division from 1965 to 1968, Levine also introduced programs, including the African Civilization sequence and the Public Policy concentration program, that remain vital to this day. He received the Quantrell Award.

Subsequently, Levine initiated the concentration program in Environmental Studies. As Dean of the college in the 1980s, he led a searching reexamination of the college curriculum, which resulted in enriched research opportunities for students, strengthened programs in the teaching of writing and foreign languages, and an expansion of the Common Core from one to two years. Levine also created novel courses of his own, some described in his 2005 book, Powers of the Mind: The Reinvention of Liberal Learning in America, which focuses on Chicago's distinctive traditions of higher education. He received the Quantrell Award for Excellence in Teaching in 1971, and won the Amoco Award for Excellence in Teaching in 1996. In 1985 he was awarded a chair, the Peter B. Ritzma Professorship.

In the area of social theory, Levine published a hundred papers and five books. He was especially well known for his critical interpretations of Auguste Comte, Emile Durkheim, Max Weber, Talcott Parsons, Robert Merton, S.N. Eisenstadt, and above all Georg Simmel, in whose writings he is often credited for helping to inspire a renaissance of interest. His book, Georg Simmel on Individuality and Social Forms is one of the definitive collections of Simmel's sociological contributions. He taught classical sociological theory to first-year students in Chicago's Department of Sociology for decades. He was elected Chair of the Theory Section of the American Sociological Association in 1997, and for two decades served as editor of the University of Chicago Press's Heritage of Sociology series. Levine served on the editorial boards of the American Journal of Sociology, Journal of Classical Sociology, Journal of the History of the Behavioral Sciences, and Theory, Culture & Society.

For five decades, Levine was also active in the area of Ethiopian Studies. In this, field he published two seminal books and dozens of papers. He organized the Fifth International Conference of Ethiopian Studies at the University of Chicago in 1978. For his expertise as an Ethiopianist he served as consultant to public and governmental organizations, include the U.S. Department of State, the United States Senate, and the Peace Corps. Before joining the Chicago faculty in 1962, he taught at Ethiopia's University College of Addis Ababa. Levine eventually received a Doctor of Letters honoris causa in 2004 from Addis Ababa University, where his citation read: "Ethiopianist, sociological theorist, educator: you have succeeded in all three vocations. Your pioneering work, Wax and Gold, has become an Ethiopian classic. As manifested in its title, yours is an exceptionally imaginative quest to reach an understanding of Amhara society from the internal point of view. The very concept of "Wax and Gold" has taken a life of its own: it figures at once in our understanding of Ethiopia's pre-modern culture and in our coming to grips with Ethiopia's reception of modernity. Greater Ethiopia draws attention to the deep fact that Ethiopian life is rooted in multicultural identities, and it also demonstrates the salient bonds that hold them together."

In 1979, Levine began the practice of aikido, to which he remained devoted ever since. In 2003, he was promoted to the rank of yondan (4th-degree black belt) through the Aikido Schools of Ueshiba. He served as head instructor of the University of Chicago Aikido Club since the late 1980s. In 1986 he began teaching a credit course, Conflict Theory and Aikido, described in Powers of the Mind. The course helps students to understand and manage social conflict by combining texts from a number of disciplines with regular training in aikido’s aggression-neutralizing techniques. He was founding president of Aiki Extensions Inc., a non-profit organization that networks and supports individuals involved with “off-the-mat” aikido applications. In 2011 he compiled a selection of his articles related to aikido under the title, Aiki Waza Michi Shirube, Aikido Practice is a Signpost to the Way.

== Selected publications ==
- Greater Ethiopia: The Evolution of a Multiethnic Society, revised edition. Chicago: University of Chicago Press, 2000.
- The Dialogical Turn. Essays in Honors of Donald N. Levine. ed. C. Camic and Hans Joas. Rowman & Littlefield, 2004.
- The Continuing Challenge of Weber's Theory of Rational Action, Economy and Society at 2000. Stanford University Press, 2005.
- Powers of the Mind: The Reinvention of Liberal Learning in America. Chicago: University of Chicago Press, 2006.
- The View of Life, by Georg Simmel. Translation of Lebensanschauung. Chicago: University of Chicago Press, 2010.
- Social Theory as a Vocation: Genres of Theory Work in Sociology. New Brunswick, NJ: Transaction Publishers, 2014.
- Interpreting Ethiopia: Observations of Five Decades. Los Angeles, CA: Tsehai Publishers, 2014.
- "Dialogical Social Theory." ed. Howard G. Schneiderman. New York: Routledge, 2018.
