= Bernd Reiter =

German political scientist

Political Scientist and Professor at Texas Tech University

Bernd Reiter is a political scientist and professor at Texas Tech University. He formerly served as the Director of the Institute for The Study of Latin American and the Caribbean (ISLAC) and professor of political science for the School of Interdisciplinary Global Studies at the University of South Florida. His research focuses on democracy, race and decolonization. Reiter is a decolonization scholar and has collaborated with such authors as Arturo Escobar (anthropologist), Sandra Harding, Raewyn Connell, Catherine Walsh, Gustavo Esteva, Walter Mignolo, and Aram Ziai. He has also made contributions to Critical Whiteness Studies. In 2017, he gave a TEDx talk on The Crisis of Liberal Democracy and the Path Ahead .

== Background ==
Reiter earned his Ph.D. in Political Science from the City University of New York in Comparative Politics. He earned his BA and MA at the University of Hamburg, Germany, in sociology, Latin American studies, and anthropology. During his time at the City University of New York, Reiter was a research associate (1999-2002) and a senior research associate (2004-2005) at the Howard Samuels State Management and Policy Center at CUNY Graduate Center.

== Academic, activist and professional career ==
Since 2005, he has worked at the University of South Florida, as an assistant professor (2005–2011), associate professor (2011–2016), and full professor (since 2016). Reiter was born in Germany, where he was involved with the Fair Trade Movement, the Peace Movement, and the Anti WAA Movement.

He conducted peace service, in lieu of military service, in Colombia, working with abandoned children in Ibague, Tolima (1989) and with rural black youth in Condoto, Choco (1990)

Reiter studied, lived, and worked from 1992 to 1998 in Salvador, Bahia, Brazil, first attending the Federal University of Bahia (UFBA) and later working as a social worker and consultant for several local and international NGOs. He co-coordinated the effort by Bahian musician Carlinhos Brown to urbanize the neighborhood of Candeal Pequeno. This project led to the foundation of the Pracatum School and the urbanization of the neighborhood through the Ta Rebocado Project. Reiter was primarily responsible for the active involvement of the local population in the planning and monitoring of the urbanization project, fundraising, and general management of the Pracatum School and the Ta Reboca Project. Both Pracatum and Ta Rebocado won several international awards and became the theme of the movie The Miracle of Candeal (El Milagro del Candeal), by Spanish filmmaker Fernando Trueba.

Reiter has conducted research on citizenship and democracy, nationalism, exclusion, racism, school reform, and microfinance in Brazil, Colombia, Portugal, Germany, France, and Ghana. His articles have appeared in Anarchist Studies, Journal of Civil Society, Journal of International Development, Journal of Developing Societies, Journal of Ethnic and Migration Studies, Latin American Perspectives, Citizenship Studies, Race & Class, among others. His books explore The Crisis of Liberal Democracy and the Path Ahead (2017), The Dialectics of Citizenship (2013), and Negotiating Democracy in Brazil (2008).

He has co-written, edited and co-edited several books on such topics as decolonization, bridging scholarship and activism, racial politics in Brazil and development.

== Awards, grants, and recognition ==
- 2019 Distinguished Alumnus/Alumna Award of the Graduate Center, CUNY Political Science PhD/MA Program
- 2018 Keynote Address, World Social Forum - Salvador, Bahia, Brazil
- 2016 President’s Award, Florida Education Fund
- 2015 University of South Florida Faculty Global Achievement Award
- 2014 University of South Florida Status of Latinos Faculty Award
- 2013 Erasmus Mundus Visiting Scholar, Institut Barcelona d'Estudis Internacionals, Barcelona, Spain
- 2003 Portuguese Foundation for Science and Technology (Fundação para a Ciência e Tecnologia) Research Grant and Postdoctoral Fellowship
- 2002 Foundation for International Relations and Foreign Dialogue (FRIDE), Research Grant, Spain

Throughout his academic career, Reiter has received several research grants from the Spencer Foundation, the Ford Foundation and the Rockefeller Foundation, supporting his research on democracy, citizenship, participation, racism, exclusion, and school reform in Brazil.

== Books ==
The following is a partial list of publications.

=== Monographs ===
- Legal Duty & Upper Limits: How to Save Our Democracy and Planet From The Rich

- The Crisis of Liberal Democracy and the Path Ahead. London: Rowman & Littlefield International, September 2017.
- The Dialectics of Citizenship: Exploring Privilege, Exclusion, and Racialization. East Lansing: Michigan State University Press, May 2013.
- Negotiating Democracy in Brazil: The Politics of Exclusion. Boulder: First Forum Press, October 2008.

=== Co-authored books ===
- The Democratic Challenge. Democratization and De-Democratization in Global Perspective, with Jorge Nef (co-author). New York: Palgrave MacMillan, May 2009.

=== Edited books ===
- Constructing the Pluriverse: The Geopolitics of Knowledge. Durham: Duke University Press, September 2018.
- The Making of Brazil’s Black Mecca: Bahia Reconsidered, with Scott Ickes (coeditor). East Lansing: Michigan State University Press, October 2018.
- Bridging Scholarship and Activism: Reflections from the Frontlines of Collaborative Research, with Ulrich Oslender (co-editor). East Lansing: Michigan State University Press, January 2015.
- Afrodescendants, Identity, and the Struggle for Development in the Americas, with Kimberly Eison Simmons (co-editor), East Lansing: Michigan State University Press, Spring 2012.
- Brazil’s New Racial Politics, with Gladys Mitchell (co-editor), Boulder: Lynne Rienner Publishers, October 2009.
