= Krishan =

Krishan is a given name and surname. Notable persons with that name include:

== People with the given name ==
- Krishan Bheel (born 1968), Pakistani politician
- Krishan Chander (1914–1977), Urdu and Hindi Afsaana Nigaar, or short story writer
- Krishan Dev Sethi, the current general secretary of Democratic Conference Jammu and Kashmir
- Krishan Dinidu (born 1990), Sri Lankan cricketer
- Krishan Imdika (born 1976), Sri Lankan cricketer
- Krishan Kant, the tenth vice president of India from 1997 until his death
- Krishan Kant Saini (born 1931), Indian Airforce helicopter pilot who achieved the world's highest altitude helicopter landing
- Krishan Kumar (sociologist) (born 1942), British sociologist
- Krishan Kumar (actor), Indian film actor and producer
- Krishan Kumar Modi, (born 1940), Indian businessman and head of Modi Enterprises
- Krishan Lal Balmiki (1942–2010), Indian politician of the Bharatiya Janata Party, member of the Parliament of India representing Rajasthan
- Krishan Sabnani (born 1954), senior vice president of the Networking Research Laboratory at Alcatel-Lucent Bell Labs in New Jersey
- Maharaj Krishan Kaushik (1955–2021), former member of the India men's national field hockey team and former coach
- Predhiman Krishan Kaw, Indian plasma physicist, currently the director of the Institute for Plasma Research
- Raj Krishan Gaur (born 1931), Agricultural minister from Himachal
- Vikas Krishan Yadav (born 1992), Indian male boxer from Bhiwani district in Haryana, won a gold medal in the 2010 Asian Games

== People with the surname ==
- Gopal Krishan, Indian musician and player of the vichitra veena
- Guru Har Krishan (1656–1664), the eighth of the Eleven Gurus of Sikhism
- Kewal Krishan (1923–2008), Indian medical practitioner and politician
- Rajendra Krishan (1919–1988), Indian poet, lyricist and screenwriter

== See also ==
- Krischan
- Krishan Avtaar, 1993 Hindi-language Indian feature film
- Krishan Nagar, a neighbourhood in Lahore, Punjab, Pakistan
- Shaheed Krishan Chand Memorial Stadium, a cricket ground in Mandi, Himachal Pradesh, India
