= Knowledge Elite and the Failure of Prophecy =

1985 book by Eva Etzioni-Halevy

- Author: Eva Etzioni-Halevy
- Language: English
- Subject: Sociology
- Publication date: 1985
- Pages: 136
- ISBN: 978-0-04-301193-5

Knowledge Elite and the Failure of Prophecy is a 1985 book by Eva Etzioni-Halevy in which the author studies intellectual knowledge in contemporary societies.

Eliška Freiová, Bryan S. Turner, and George Becker have reviewed the book.
