= Krische =

Krische is a German language surname. It stems from a reduced form of the male given name Christian. Notable people with the name include:

- Joseph Krische, former U.S. soccer defender
- Michael J. Krische (1966), American chemist
