= Body politic (disambiguation) =

A body politic is a metaphor in which a political community is considered as a single entity and likened to a human body.

Body politic may also refer to:

- The Body Politic (magazine), a Canadian monthly magazine published from 1971 to 1987
- Body Politic (TV pilot), 2009 television pilot, which was not picked up as a series
- Sociology of the body
