= John O'Neill (sociologist) =

Canadian sociologist (1933–2022)

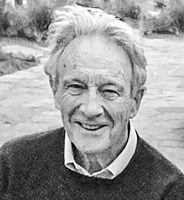
- Born: John O'Neill; July 17, 1933; Hendon, Sunderland London, England
- Died: September 7, 2022 (aged 89); Toronto, Canada
- Occupations: Sociologist, professor
- Known for: Sociology, Philosophy, Phenomenology
- Notable work: Sociology as a Skin Trade: Essays Towards a Reflexive Sociology (1972), The Communicative Body: Studies in Communicative Philosophy, Politics, and Sociology (1989), Five Bodies: Re-figuring Relationships (2004), The Domestic Economy of the Soul: Freud’s Five Case Histories (2011), Writing the Body Politic: A John O’Neill Reader (2020)

John O'Neill (July 17, 1933 – September 7, 2022) was a Canadian sociologist, phenomenologist, and social theorist known for his writings on critical social theory, philosophy, political economy, literary theory, psychoanalysis, and mass culture. O’Neill was the author, editor, and translator of over 30 books and hundreds of articles, many of which have been translated into French, German, Japanese, and Mandarin. O’Neill's work focuses on the notion of corporeal knowledge and embodiment as mediated by familial relationships and social welfare. O’Neill was Distinguished Professor of Sociology at York University (Emeritus), where he also co-founded the Programme in Social and Political Thought in 1972.

O'Neill was founder of the Communications and Culture Joint Programme at York and Ryerson University, Senior Scholar at the Laidlaw Foundation’s Children at Risk Programme and Centre for Comparative Literature at the University of Toronto. He became a Fellow of the Royal Society of Canada in 1985. He was also co-editor of the International Quarterly, Philosophy of the Social Sciences and the Journal of Classical Sociology, and associate editor of Body & Society. O’Neill’s intellectual influences included Michel de Montaigne, Giambattista Vico, G. W. F. Hegel, Karl Marx, Sigmund Freud, Maurice Merleau-Ponty, Herbert Marcuse, and Michel Foucault.

== Education and academic career ==
O’Neill was born and raised in northwest London by Irish Catholic parents of working-class background with his younger sister Joan. O’Neill received a BA in sociology from the London School of Economics in 1955 where he immersed himself in classics of social and political theory from Plato to L.T. Hobhouse. He received a Fulbright scholarship to the University of Notre Dame in Indiana where he completed his Master’s in political science in 1957. O’Neill then attended classes at Harvard for a semester where he was introduced to Paul Sweezy, an American Marxist and former Harvard professor. Sweezy suggested he pursue his PhD at Stanford where Sweezy’s friend Paul Baran took on O’Neill as a student, and whose collected essays O'Neill would later edit and publish.

After completing his PhD, O’Neill worked at York University in Toronto, where he had three children with his wife Maria (née Doerig). He dedicated several books to his children, Daniela, Gregory, and Brendan. In 1985, O’Neill married Susan Hallam with whom he hosted graduate classes and seminars in the dining room of their home for many years. His wife Susan was a support to O’Neill in his career, often typing and proofreading many of his manuscripts as he preferred to write by hand. Under Baran’s mentorship and during the early days of his career, O’Neill developed his own approach to the critique of Marxist scientism and Hegelian Marxist social theory. O’Neill’s main study upon completing his PhD was French phenomenological philosopher Maurice Merleau-Ponty. Publishing several translations of his texts, O'Neill extended Merleau-Ponty’s ideas on the body and Marxist philosophy and politics into a sociology of the body and a critical theory of the body politic.

== Sociological and theoretical writings ==
In an autobiographical note O’Neill wrote in the early 2000s, he describes his research as being focused on Frankfurt School critical social theory and Continental phenomenology. In both areas, he considers the problem of the complementarity between causal explanation and hermeneutical interpretation in emancipatory social science. He writes that his research on the sociology of embodiment anticipated basic problems in current women’s, race, and colonial studies and contributes to the work of media researchers and other scholars in the social sciences. O’Neill’s many books and essays address five main themes: the phenomenology and sociology of the body; the critique of Marxist scientism and postmodernism; a meta-psychoanalysis of textuality; a social theory of civic capitalism, child suffering and the welfare state; all these topics are informed by a critical theory of the body politic.

=== Phenomenology and sociology of the body ===
O’Neill’s study of the French phenomenological philosopher Maurice Merleau-Ponty led him to develop ideas on the social, productive, and political body. Inspired by the young Karl Marx’s ideas on estrangement and alienation between the worker and world, O’Neill’s Sociology as a Skin Trade in (1972) outlines his theory of how corporate capitalism operates through bodies which are transformed into objects, commodities, and machines and thus given monetary value. O’Neill treats ‘skin trade’ as a dialectical concept to explore how, on the one hand, humans are connected through their physical contact in the world, and on the other hand, they are tied to systems of power that operate through capitalist violence. In later works, such as The Communicative Body (1989), where he also develops a theory of childhood development through the work of Jacques Lacan, O’Neill grounds his phenomenological ideas by emphasizing the corporeal body as the medium through which we engage with the world. By focusing on the body, and combining Continental and Anglo-American intellectual traditions, O’Neill critiques conceptions of sociology that interpret and explain actions in terms of abstract categories, including functionalist and postmodern theories.

=== Critique of Marxist scientism and postmodernism ===
In his career-long writings on Hegelian Marxist critical theory, including the essays collected in For Marx Against Althusser (1982), The Poverty of Postmodernism (1995), Plato’s Cave (1991, revised and republished in 2002), and the edited collection On Critical Theory (1976), O’Neill critiques the scientism that underwrites both Marxism and postmodernism. In advancing a conception of what he calls 'Orphic Marxism', and through a reading of Herbert Marcuse and Michel Foucault, he argues that this ‘reformulation of Marxist humanism gives emphasis to its civility over its industrialism’. In contrast to the postmodernism of Jean-François Lyotard, Fredric Jameson, and others, whom he treats as having reduced to the sensory register of fleeting simulacra of endless desire, the human body should be considered 'the figure of a great civilizing narrative that cannot be separated from the equally humanizing figure of work’. By centring critical intelligence on the body, and by bridging emancipatory, analytical, and expressive ways of knowing, O’Neill examines how social alienation and inequality can be viewed as more or less a common experience. This style of research also means that the sociologist can never be removed from the subject of study, and is therefore not an alien observer but always a carnal, embodied thinker engaged with others.

=== Meta-psychoanalysis of textuality ===
Beginning with his book Essaying Montaigne: A Study of the Renaissance Institution of Writing and Reading (1982, revised and republished in 2001), O’Neill proposes a literary theory of writing and reading as corporeal conduct, here focusing on the textual practices and reception of Michel de Montaigne's Essays. In the essays collected in Critical Conventions (1992) and Incorporating Cultural Theory (2002), which discuss such thinkers as Roland Barthes and Jacques Derrida along with the fiction of Italo Svevo and James Joyce, among others, he broadens this approach to post-structuralist interpretation into a meta-psychoanalytic theory of what he calls 'homotextuality/gynesis' through a series of critical studies of the conventions of style and disciplinarity in the literary and social sciences. In his edited anthology Freud and the Passions (1996), and The Domestic Economy of the Soul (2011), based on yearly seminars O’Neill taught to graduate students over more than two decades, he conducts a lyrical meditation on Sigmund Freud’s famous five case histories and other writings. As Mark Featherstone and Thomas Kemple summarize O’Neill’s theory of the text in Writing the Body Politic (2020), the lessons students take away from these seminars is that 'we read and write books with our bodies in the course of a lifelong transaction, or semiosis’.

=== Civic capitalism and defence of the civic state ===
In several essays and two shorter books, The Missing Child in Liberal Theory (1994) and Civic Capitalism (2004), O’Neill advances a defence of the welfare state against liberal, neoliberal, and neoconservative critics who neglect structural inequalities and institutional solutions while arguing that the state has become a symbol of potential totalitarianism. Drawing on an alternative genealogy of social and political thought from Giambattista Vico to Marcel Mauss, and emphasizing a distinctively Canadian tradition of civic practice, O’Neill argues instead that the ‘civic state’ must foster giving, welfare, civic virtue, and collective care for the most vulnerable, especially children and future generations, as the core principles of any civilization committed to abandoning the barbaric ethics of individual greed. Without ignoring the lessons of Marxist theory and in part by displacing Eurocentric thought through critiques of the work of Talcott Parsons, Hannah Arendt, John Rawls, and Gilles Deleuze and Félix Guattari, these later writings address urgent issues of childhood and family in the context of liberal-communitarianism by formulating a concept of what he calls ‘civic capitalism’.

=== Critical theory of the body politic ===
In their edited collection of mid-career and later writings in the O’Neill Reader, O'Neill's former students Featherstone and Kemple note that he first formulated his theory of the body politic in response to the counter-cultural movements of the 1960s, which he revisited throughout his career, culminating in the four-part scheme he proposed in the second edition of Five Bodies (revised and republished in 2004). The figure of the body politic – articulated at the levels of the biological, productive, libidinal, and civic bodies – derives from the Christian, medieval, and Renaissance imagery of ‘the king’s two bodies’, one a physio-corporeal and the other a socio-institutional articulation of the polity itself. Extrapolating this scheme into our everyday experience of both the physical and communicative body, O’Neill's later work approaches the human sciences as the endless work of sense-making and critical reflection on current crises and contemporary problems. For this reason, O’Neill’s focus on the body entails an effort to ground social theorists, readers, and sociologists in their experiences, perceptions, and embodied efforts to make sense of social life while remaking the cultural world.

== Works ==
=== Books ===
- 1970. Perception, Expression and History: The Social Phenomenology of Merleau-Ponty. Evanston: Northwestern University Press (revised and reprinted in 1989 below).
- 1972. Sociology as a Skin Trade: Essays Towards a Reflexive Sociology. London, Heinemann, and New York: Harper & Row.
- 1974. Making Sense Together: An Introduction to Wild Sociology. London: Heinemann, and New York: Harper & Rowe (revised and reprinted in 1989 belos).
- 1982. For Marx Against Althusser, and Other Essays. Washington, DC: Center for Advanced Research in Phenomenology and University Press of America.
- 1989. The Communicative Body: Studies in Communicative Philosophy, Politics and Sociology. Evanston: Northwestern University Press (French translation 1995; Japanese translation 1992).
- 1992. Critical Conventions: Interpretation in the Literary Arts and Sciences. Norman: University of Oklahoma Press.
- 1994. The Missing Child in Liberal Theory: Towards a Covenant Theory of Family, Community, Welfare and the Civic State. Toronto: University of Toronto Press.
- 1995. The Poverty of Postmodernism. London: Routledge.
- 2001. Essaying Montaigne: A Study of the Renaissance Institution of Writing and Reading. Liverpool: The University of Liverpool Press (revised from 1982 edition with Routledge & Kegan Paul).
- 2002. Incorporating Cultural Theory: Maternity at the Millennium. Albany: State University Press of New York.
- 2002. Plato’s Cave: Television and Its Discontents. Cresskill, NJ: Hampton Press Inc. (revised from 1991 edition with Ablex Publishing Corporation).
- 2004. Civic Capitalism: The State of Childhood. Toronto: University of Toronto Press.
- 2004. Five Bodies: Re-figuring Relationships. London: Sage Publications (revised from 1985 edition with Cornell University Press; Chinese translation 1996; German translation 1989).
- 2011. The Domestic Economy of the Soul: Freud’s Five Case Histories. London: Sage Publications (Chinese translation 2016).
- 2020. Writing the Body Politic: A John O’Neill Reader. Mark Featherstone and Thomas Kemple (eds.). London: Routledge.

=== Selected articles, book chapters, and edited collections ===
- 1963. ‘Alienation, Class Struggle and Marxian Anti-Politics’. The Review of Metaphysics, XVII 3): 462–71.
- 1964. ‘The Concept of Estrangement in the Early and Later Writings of Karl Marx’. Philosophy and Phenomenological Research, XXV (1): 64–84 (revised and reprinted in 1972a and 1982 above).
- 1969. ‘Translator’s Note’. In Maurice Merleau-Ponty, Humanism and Terror: An Essay on the Communist Problem. John O’Neill (trans.) Boston: Beacon Press, pp. vii–xi.
- 1969. ‘Introduction: Marxism and the Sociological Imagination’. In Paul Baran, The Longer View: Essays Toward a Critique of Political Economy. John O’Neill (ed.). New York: Monthly Review Press, pp. xiii–xvii.
- 1970. ‘Preface’ and ‘Introduction: Perception, Expression and History’. In Phenomenology, Language, and Society: Essays from Maurice Merleau-Ponty. John O’Neill (ed.). London: Heinemann, pp. v–lxii (revised and reprinted in 1989).
- 1970. ‘Translator’s Preface’. In Maurice Merleau-Ponty, Themes from the Lectures at the Collège de France 1952–1960. John O’Neill (trans., ed.). Evanston: Northwestern University Press, pp. xi–xvii.
- 1972. ‘Scientism, Historicism, and the Problem of Rationality’. In Modes of Individualism and Collectivism. John O’Neill (ed.). London: Heinemann, pp. 3–26.
- 1973. ‘Hegel and Marx on History as Human History’. In Jean Hyppolite, Studies on Marx and Hegel. John O’Neill (ed., trans.). New York: Harper Torchbooks, pp. xi–xx (earlier version in 1972; revised and reprinted in 1982).
- 1973. ‘On Simmel’s Sociological Apriorities’. In Phenomenological Sociology: Issues and Applications. George Psathas (ed.). New York: Wiley, pp. 91–106 (earlier version in 1972).
- 1973. ‘Translator’s Introduction: Language and the Voice of Philosophy’. In Maurice Merleau-Ponty, The Prose of the World. John O’Neill (trans.). Evanston: Northwestern University Press, pp. xxv–xlvi (revised and reprinted in 1989).
- 1974. ‘Philosophy and Revolution: A Review.’ Telos, 22: 163–71.
- 1974. ‘Philosophical Speech and the Poetry of Review.’ Semiotica, X (3): 288–91.
- 1975. ‘Gay Technology and the Body Politic’, pp. 291–302. In The Body as a Medium of Expression. Jonathan Benthall and Ted Polhemus (eds.). London: Allen Lane.
- 1975. ‘Facts, Myths, and the Nationalist Platitude’. Canadian Journal of Sociology, 1: 107–24.
- 1975. ‘Lecture Visuelle de l’Espace Urbain’. In Colloque d’Esthétique Appliquée á la Création du Paysage Urbain. Paris: Copedith, pp. 235–44.
- 1976. ‘Time’s Body’. In Giambattista Vico’s Science of Humanity. Giorgio Tagliacozzo, Donald Phillip Verene (eds.). Baltimore and London: The Johns Hopkins University Press, pp. 333–39 (earlier version in 1974a).
- 1976. ‘Critique and Remembrance’. In On Critical Theory. John O’Neill (ed.). New York: Seabury Press; London: Heinemann, pp. 1–14.
- 1977. ‘When is Sociology Phenomenological?’ The Annals of Phenomenological Sociology, II: 1–40.
- 1978. ‘Socratic Essay’. In What it Means to be Human. Ross Fitzgerald (ed.). Oxford: Pergamon Press, pp. 25–43.
- 1978. ‘Mind and Institution’. In Interdisciplinary Phenomenology. Don Ihde, Richard M. Zaner (eds.). The Hague: Martinus Nijhoff, pp. 99–108.
- 1980. ‘From Phenomenology to Ethnomethodology: Some Radical Misreadings’. Current Perspectives in Sociological Theory, 1: 7–20.
- 1981. ‘A Preface to Frame Analysis’. Human Studies, 4: 359–64.
- 1981. ‘McLuhan’s Loss of Innis-Sense’. Canadian Forum, LXI/709: 13–15.
- 1983. ‘Vico on the Natural Workings of the Mind’. Phenomenology and the Human Sciences, Supplement to Philosophical Topics, 12: 117–25.
- 1983. ‘Naturalism in Vico and Marx: A Theory of the Body Politic’. In Vico and Marx: Affinities and Contrasts. Giorgio Tagliacozzo (ed.). Atlantic Highlands, NJ: Humanities Press, pp. 277–89 (earlier version in 1982).
- 1983. ‘Reflection and Radical Finitude’. Journal of the British Society for Phenomenology, 14: 17–22.
- 1985. ‘Phenomenological Sociology’. The Canadian Review of Sociology and Anthropology, 22 (5): 748–70.
- 1985. ‘The Essay as a Moral Exercise: Montaigne’. Renaissance and Reformation, 21 (3): 210–18.
- 1986. ‘Decolonization and the Ideal Speech Community: Some Issues in the Theory and Practice of Communicative Competence’. In Critical Theory and Public Life. John Forester (ed.). Cambridge: MIT Press, pp. 57–76.
- 1986. ‘To Kill the Future?’ In Environmental Ethics: Philosophical and Policy Perspectives. Philip P. Hanson (ed.). Burnaby: Simon Fraser University Press, pp. 163–73.
- 1991. 'Introduction - The Fragmentation of Sociology'. Co-authored with Bryan Turner. Journal of Classical Sociology 1(1): 5-12.
- 1993. ‘McTopia: Eating Time’. In Utopias and The Millennium. Krishan Kumar and Stephen Baum (eds.). London: Reaktion Books, pp. 129–37.
- 1994. ‘Two Body Criticism: A Genealogy of the Postmodern Anti-Aesthetic’. History and Theory, 33 (1): 61–78.
- 1994. ‘Vico and Myth’. In The Imaginative Basis of Thought and Culture: Contemporary Perspectives on Giambattista Vico. Marcel Danesi and Frank Nuessel (eds.). Toronto: Canadian Scholars Press, pp. 99–111.
- 1996. ‘Introduction: A Dialectical Genealogy of Self, Society, and Culture in and After Hegel’. In Hegel’s Dialectic of Desire and Recognition: Texts and Commentary. John O’Neill (ed.). Albany: State University of New York Press, pp. 25–40.
- 1996. ‘The Question of an Introduction: Understanding and the Passion of Ignorance’. In Freud and the Passions. John O’Neill (ed.). University Park: Penn State Press, pp. 1–11.
- 1996. 'Loi et genèse: Freud (ren)contre Schreber'. In Schreber et paranoïa: Le meutre de l'âme. Luiz Eduardo Prado de Oliveira (ed.). Paris: L'Harmattan, pp. 135–148.
- 1997. ‘Is The Child A Political Subject?’ Childhood: A Global Journal of Child Research, 4 (2): 241–50.
- 1998. ‘Endless Knowledge’. Social Epistemology, 12 (1): 79–84.
- 1998. ‘Civic Capital: Education and the National Economy’. In The New Higher Education: Issues and Directions for the Post-Dearing University. David Jary and Martin Parker (eds.). Stoke-on-Trent: Staffordshire University Press, pp. 303–18.
- 1999. ‘Children and the Civic State: A Covenant Model of Welfare’. In Counselling and the Therapeutic State. James J. Chriss (ed.). New York: Aldine De Gruyter, pp. 33–54.
- 1999. ‘Have You Had Your Theory Today?’ In Resisting McDonaldization. Barry Smart (ed.). London: Sage Publications, pp. 41–56.
- 2001. ‘Horror Autotoxicus: The Dual Economy of Aids’. In Contested Bodies. Ruth Holliday and John Hassard (eds.). London: Routledge, pp. 179–85.
