= The Cambridge Dictionary of Sociology =

- Author: Bryan S. Turner (editor)
- Language: English
- Subject: Sociology
- Publication date: 2006
- Publication place: United Kingdom
- Pages: 686
- ISBN: 9780521540469
- OCLC: 70173369
- Dewey Decimal: 301
- Website: Official

The Cambridge Dictionary of Sociology is a dictionary of sociological terms published by Cambridge University Press and edited by Bryan S. Turner. There has only been one edition so far. The Board of Editorial Advisors is made up of: Bryan S. Turner, Ira Cohen, Jeff Manza, Gianfranco Poggi, Beth Schneider, Susan Silbey, and Carol Smart. In addition there are nearly 100 other contributors.
