= Institut Barcelona d'Estudis Internacionals =

International studies school in Barcelona, Spain

Institut Barcelona d'Estudis Internacionals Barcelona Institute of International Studies
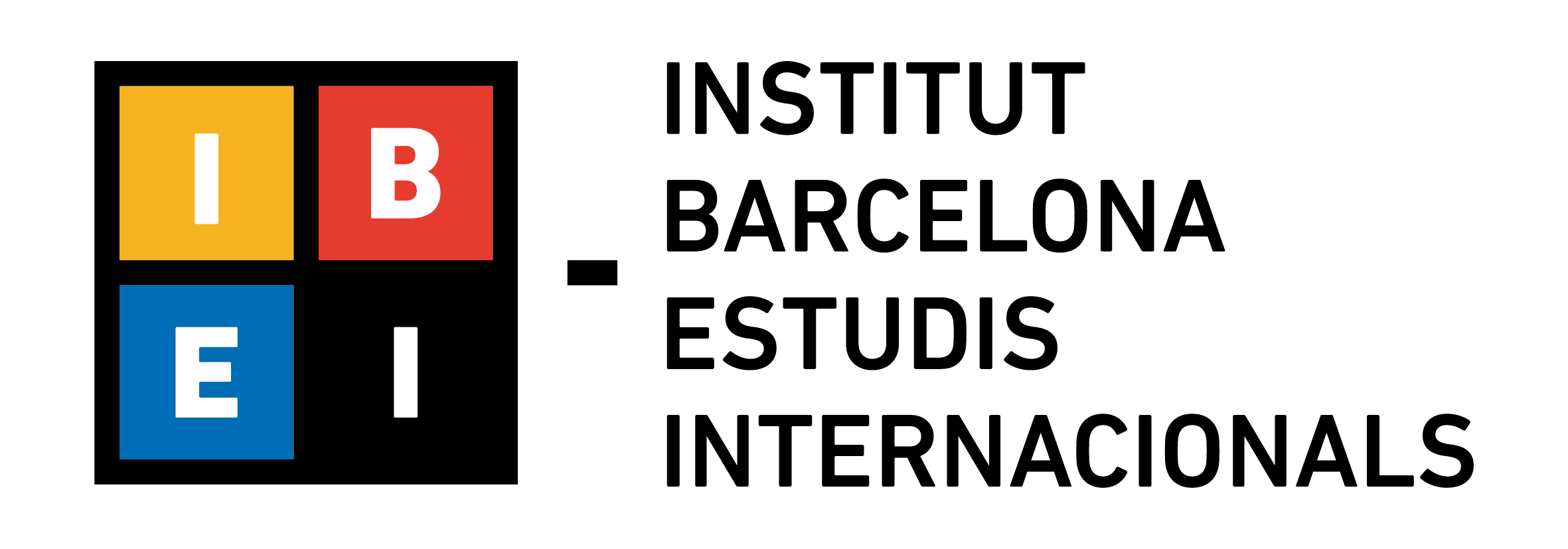
- Type: Interuniversity Postgraduate Institute
- Established: 2004
- Parent institution: Pompeu Fabra University; University of Barcelona; Autonomous University of Barcelona
- Affiliations: APSIA; ECPR; IPSA; CLACSO
- President: Jacint Jordana
- Director: Laura Chaqués Bonafont
- Academic staff: 55
- Students: 150
- Location: Ramon Trias Fargas, 25–27, Barcelona, Catalonia, Spain; 41.3897°N 2.1897°E
- Campus: City
- Language: Catalan; Spanish; English
- Colors
- Nickname: IBEI
- Website: ibei.org
- Location in Barcelona Institut Barcelona d'Estudis Internacionals (Catalonia) Institut Barcelona d'Estudis Internacionals (Spain)

The Institut Barcelona d'Estudis Internacionals (IBEI) (Spanish: Instituto Barcelona de Estudios Internacionales, English: Barcelona Institute of International Studies) is an inter-university research institute and postgraduate education center located in Barcelona, Spain. Established in 2004, it was formed as a collaborative initiative between the Barcelona Centre for International Affairs and five universities in the Barcelona metropolitan area: Pompeu Fabra University, University of Barcelona, Autonomous University of Barcelona, Polytechnic University of Catalonia, and Open University of Catalonia. The institute focuses on international studies. The IBEI is chaired by Jacint Jordana, Professor of Political Science and Administration at Pompeu Fabra University, whose research specializes in comparative public policy analysis, especially regulatory policies and their institutions. Narcís Serra, a Spanish economist and former politician who served as Mayor of Barcelona, Minister of Defense, and Vice President of the Government of Spain, serves as honorary president.

The current Director of the Institute is Laura Chaqués Bonafont, Professor of Political Science at the University of Barcelona.

Students at IBEI are awarded joint degrees from Pompeu Fabra University, the University of Barcelona, and the Autonomous University of Barcelona. All master programs are taught in English, and the Masters in International Relations has an English-Spanish bilingual version.

IBEI is an affiliate member of the Association of Professional Schools of International Affairs (APSIA). IBEI's masters are accredited as official university master's degrees. The institute attracts a diverse international student body, with students from more than 40 countries admitted each year.

The institute has developed scientific production that focuses on the relationship between domestic affairs and the international dimension in four major areas: Global Governance, Networks and Institutions in a Globalized Economy, Development and Security, and Power and Multilateralism in a Global World. IBEI is currently recognized as one of the focal points at the European level in the fields of Political science and International Affairs.

== Location ==
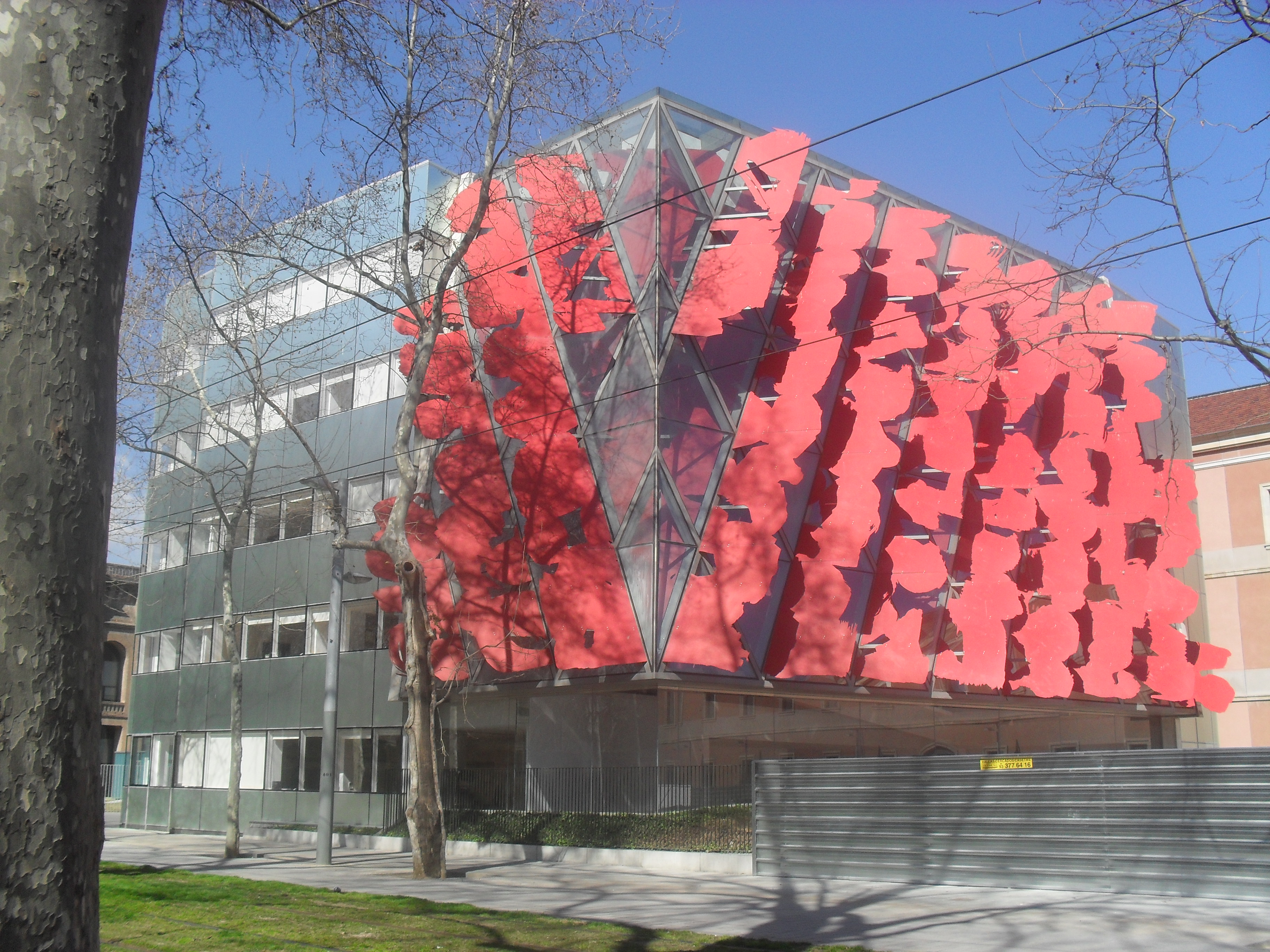
Merce Rodoreda Building, on Pompeu Fabra University's Ciutadella Campus

Since September 2014, IBEI is located at Pompeu Fabra University's Ciutadella Campus in the center of Barcelona. The institute was located in Elisabets Street for ten years, in the neighborhood of El Raval, Ciutat Vella in Barcelona. The sixteenth-century building, located next to the CIDOB, is part of the complex of the House of Mercy, an old school for orphaned girls. The Institute and several research groups share the same building.

== Study Programs ==
IBEI offers four postgraduate courses: Master in International Relations, Master in International Security, Erasmus Mundus Master in Public Policy (Mundus MAPP), and Master in International Development. Summer courses are also organized every year.

=== Master's in International Relations ===
The Master's in International Relations was the first to be launched. It has an average of 90 students enrolled every year from more than 30 different nationalities. It's taught in two versions: bilingual (English-Spanish) and English, as well as full-time in one year or part-time in two.

It offers five areas of specialization: Conflict in Global Politics, Governance and Diplomacy, Environment and Sustainability, Global Political Economy, and The Politics of the MENA Region. IBEI also has agreements with various international organizations, NGO, governments and multinational corporations to provide internships for students.

=== Master's in International Security ===
The Master's in International security is an annual course, and has an average of about 20 students every year from 15 different nationalities.

=== Master's in International Development ===
It is an annual interdisciplinary program and is aimed at providing students with knowledge in development from an international perspective.

=== Erasmus Mundus Masters Program in Public Policy (Mundus MAPP) ===
The Erasmus Mundus Masters Program in Public Policy (Mundus MAPP) is a 2-year international Masters course funded by the European Commission. This program is offered jointly by IBEI, Central European University in Budapest (Hungary), International Institute of Social Studies of the Erasmus University Rotterdam in The Hague (The Netherlands), and University of York (United Kingdom).

=== Erasmus Mundus in International Law of Global Security, Peace and Development (ILGSPD) ===
The International Law of Global Security, Peace and Development (ILGSPD) is an Erasmus Mundus Joint Master Degree (EMJMD) programme funded by the European Commission's European Education and Culture Executive Agency (EACEA), running from 2021 until 2026. It is a multidisciplinary postgraduate programme that combines legal, political, and social dimensions of international law, within the context of global security, peace, and development.

=== Training courses ===
IBEI organizes every year a summer school within the sphere of international relations, global governance and international political economy. IBEI also organizes other activities throughout the academic year, such as the Master in Diplomacy and Foreign Action with DIPLOCAT (Generalitat of Catalonia) or Barcelona Government network courses.

== Research ==
IBEI's research activities are organized around cross-cutting and interdisciplinary research clusters. Each cluster brings together IBEI faculty members, affiliated professors, visiting scholars, and doctoral students who share expertise on a common theme and provides them with a platform to discuss their work, exchange views, and start joint research initiatives. Likewise, IBEI encourages exchange and collaboration with other centers and researchers to promote the production and dissemination of quality research.

Currently there are five IBEI research clusters:

1. The cluster on globalization and public policy focuses on the way globalization influences, and is influenced by, the capacity of different actors to defend and promote their economic and political interests.
2. The cluster on norms and rules in international relations studies the role of rules and norms in maintaining international order, as well as the extent to which formal and informal institutional actors contest them.
3. The cluster on institutions, inequality and development explores the economic and political dynamics that generate diverse inequality patterns and lead to varying developmental outcomes across the globe.
4. The cluster on security, conflict and peace looks at the drivers, consequences and politics of conflict and political violence, along with strategies that can be taken to prevent or deal with the outcomes.
5. The cluster on states, diversity and collective identities investigates the role of the state, supranational institutions and civil society actors in the construction and mobilization of collective identities.

IBEI faculty engage in a variety of research projects with international teams funded by the European Commission, the Spanish Government or the Catalan Government, among other funding sources. IBEI also runs a working papers series that disseminates work in progress. More detailed information on IBEI's research activities can be found in the research report published every two years.

=== Previous research programmes ===
Research programmers were focused in three areas: Global Governance, Networks and Institutions in a Global Economy, and Security, Power and Multilateralism in a Global World. The research projects are funded mostly through competitive calls for papers from the European Commission, the Government of Spain, the Catalan Government and other public and private institutions. Since 2008, IBEI has obtained funding for around thirty research projects.

IBEI pays particular attention to the existing challenges to be overthrown for a more balanced and multipolar international system. The scientific production of the institute is focused on connecting the interests and concerns of today's society with the dynamics of globalization and internationalization. Likewise, IBEI encourages exchange and collaboration with other centers and research professionals to promote the production and dissemination of quality research.

IBEI has also conducted research projects with international teams such as CONSENSUS, EUCROSS, BEUCITIZEN, TRANSCRISIS (funded by the European Commission), EU-PERFORM, EUMARR or GLOBALDEMOS (funded by the Government of Spain). IBEI has a series of working papers that disseminate academic papers representing work in progress. Every two years, IBEI publishes a research report with its activities and research results.

==== Global Governance ====
Global governance captures the changing patterns in which common problems are dealt with in today's increasingly interdependent world. Building on classical multilateral forms of cooperation, it encompasses today a bewildering array of actors and institutions. Public and private actors, formal and informal institutions, intergovernmental and transnational forms of regulation interact in an often uncoordinated, sometimes competitive, and typically highly complex structure. The research programme on global governance seeks to understand the shape of global governance, its changing legal and normative framework as well as accountability mechanisms as they are adapting to the changing institutional landscape. The research programme is coordinated by Nico Kirsch.

The main areas of research are: International institutions and governance structures, Actors and networks in global regulatory governance, Forms of global authority, The legitimacy of global law, Constitutional interfaces between regimes in global governance and Popular sovereignty in the global order.

==== Networks and Institutions in a Global Economy ====
The aim of this research programme is to analyze the political and social context created by the acceleration of globalization processes from the last decade of the 20th onwards, including the intensification of trade integration processes at an international level and the dynamics of the new regionalism. From the perspective of political economy, a central concern of this programme are the changes in the composition and comparative strengths of the different actors participating in the creation of public institutions and policies, whether national or transnational. The research programme is coordinated by Juan Díez Medrano.

The main thematic areas of research are: The dynamics and politics of development, The impacts of regional integration processes, The transnationalization of economic activities, The spread of policies and institutions and Democracy, states and growth.

==== Security, Power and Multilateralism in a Global World ====
The programme addresses different dimensions of the "new" security agenda, which incorporates problems of global scope (energy and environmental risks, transnational crime, global terrorism, the proliferation of weapons of mass destruction, massive population movements) that mutually reinforce both each other and traditional problems (armed conflicts, persistent poverty). Research is based on a multilateral logic, focusing on the effectiveness and legitimacy of the current security policies. The research programme is coordinated by Esther Barbé.

The main thematic areas of research are: Multilateral security institutions, Construction of the global security agenda, Conflict management and prevention, Fragile state, globalization and armed conflict and The European Union in the security sphere.

=== IBEI Working Papers ===
IBEI has a Working Papers series to disseminate academic documents representing work in progress, such as literature reviews, papers to be presented at conferences, first versions of articles or seminar drafts. The aim of this series is to provide a medium for the early publication of ongoing research projects.

== Teaching quality ==
IBEI's courses are planned within a System of Internal Quality under the responsibility of the Scientific Council of the institute. The system assesses the satisfaction of students and the overall functioning of the programmes through the Commission of Teaching Quality, the body responsible of managing and tracking training programmes. IBEI's academic offer is listed in the Register of Universities and Titles of the Ministry of Education of Spain.

== Sponsorships and Academic Partnerships ==
IBEI is sponsored by the City of Barcelona, Barcelona Province, "La Caixa" Foundation, the Catalan government and the Metropolitan Area of Barcelona among other organizations and companies.

The institute also has partnership programmes with other institutions such as the European Commission joining the Erasmus Mundus programme being part of the Consortium MUNDUS MAPP Universities, along with University of York, International Institute of Social Studies in The Hague, and Central European University in Budapest. Likewise, IBEI has signed cooperation agreements with several academic institutions in Europe, Asia and America for developing joint activities, exchange of students and teachers and further academic initiatives.

== Alumni ==
ALIBEI, the Alumni Association of the Barcelona Institute of International Studies, was founded in 2008 with the aim of fostering and strengthening relationships among alumni of the institute. It has a mentoring programme in which former student volunteers guide new students during admission and registration processes.

== Faculty ==
About twenty teachers and researchers work on a regular basis at IBEI, complemented by a significant number of visiting professors, postdoctoral researchers and various contributors. IBEI has a visiting programme for teachers from universities and research centers who are interested in international research. Since 2008, more than 70 visitor professors and researchers have passed through the facilities of IBEI. IBEI also encourages young PhD graduates to apply to competitive calls and develop their research at the institute.

=== Notable faculty members ===
- Joan Clos (1949), Spanish politician who was mayor of Barcelona
- Fred Halliday (1946–2010), Irish writer and academic specialising in International Relations and the Middle East
- Mary Kaldor (1946), British academic, currently Professor of Global Governance at the London School of Economics
- Nico Krisch (1972), legal scholar, specializing in international law, constitutional theory, and global governance
- Branko Milanović (1953), Serbian-American economist
- Luis Peral (1967–2019), Spanish academic, analyst and facilitator who specialised in international law, human rights, international humanitarian law, forced migration, peacekeeping and peace-building, conflict analysis and private diplomacy
- Bernd Reiter, director of the Institute for The Study of Latin American and the Caribbean (ISLAC) and professor of political science for the School of Interdisciplinary Global Studies at the University of South Florida
- Narcís Serra (1943), Spanish economist and politician, serving as Deputy Prime Minister of Spain from 1991 to 1995
- Martin Shaw (1947), British sociologist and academic

== Government ==
The IBEI is chaired by Jacint Jordana, Professor of Political Science and Administration at Pompeu Fabra University, whose research specializes in comparative public policy analysis, especially regulatory policies and their institutions. Narcís Serra, a Spanish economist and former politician who served as Mayor of Barcelona, Minister of Defense, and Vice President of the Government of Spain, serves as honorary president.

The current Director of the Institute is Laura Chaqués Bonafont, Professor of Political Science at the University of Barcelona.

The Board is the main governing body of the Foundation, while the Scientific Council is responsible for academic competences. IBEI also has a prestigious International Academic Council chaired by Javier Solana, meeting biannually to discuss the strategic planning.

IBEI's management team, consisting of 15 people, is responsible of the admission processes for the master's degrees, the academic management, the coordination of research projects and executive training, institutional relations and corporate communications tasks, and the economic and administrative management.
