= Luis Peral =

Spanish academic specializing in international law

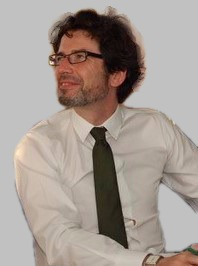
- Born: 16 June 1967; Madrid, Spain
- Died: 15 July 2019 (aged 52); Madrid, Spain
- Occupation(s): Academic, analyst, ficilitator

Luis Peral (Madrid 16 June 1967 – Madrid 15 July 2019) was a Spanish academic, analyst and facilitator who specialised in international law, human rights, international humanitarian law, forced migration, peacekeeping and peace-building, conflict analysis and private diplomacy.

Luis Peral died on 15 July 2019, due to complications following surgery.

== Biography ==
As an academic, Luis had extensive experience working with different institutions in Spain: Universidad Carlos III, Centro de Estudios Políticos y Constitucionales, IE School of International Relations, Institut Barcelona d’Estudis Internationals. He significantly contributed to the literature on international law, human rights, humanitarian law, forced migration, refugee and migration law and peacebuilding. As a legal and policy analyst, he worked principally on forced migration derived from generalised violence and conflict, as well as on the Responsibility to Protect with particular emphasis on the relationship between security and human rights. As a facilitator, he participated in confidence-building processes in Abkhazia, Georgia (with Antje Herrberg) as well as between Colombia and Venezuela. He significantly contributed to the set-up of a mechanism for monitoring the Colombian peace process, and worked on international proposals for the settlement of the Western Sahara conflict. In Tunisia and Egypt, he has been involved in supporting local actors in creating transitional justice mechanisms and facilitating democratization processes. He has been particularly involved in the design of comprehensive international responses to conflict situations in Democratic Republic of the Congo, Syria, Libya, and Afghanistan, where he was a member of the Initial Assessment Team established by the International Security Assistance Force (ISAF), the NATO-led security mission in Afghanistan. He was part of academic and policy networks of global outreach, such as the Editorial Board of the Refugee Law Reader, the Global Research Group (GG10), and the Task Force on the Role of the EU in the Prevention of Mass Atrocities.

=== Career ===
Luis started his professional career in 1991 as lecturer in Public International Law in the Universidad Carlos III of Madrid, and he combined teaching with academic research as a visitor in foreign universities in Europe, the US and South America. In those years (between 1991 and 2004) he focused his research on international law, with particular focus on human rights, humanitarian law, refugee and migration law and peacekeeping. Between 2004 and 2008 he worked in the Centro de Estudios Políticos y Constitucionales as Researcher where he undertook academic and policy-oriented research in the field of peace-building, post-conflict reconciliation and democratisation processes. During that time he held the position of Ramón y Cajal Researcher, which is the most prestigious research contract in Spain. In the same period he engaged with FRIDE, contributing to the set-up of the Global Governance Programme, and was Director of the Conflict Resolution and Crisis Management Program at the International Center of Toledo for Peace (CITpax).

In 2008 Luis moved to Paris to join the European Union Institute for Security Studies (EUISS). He produced policy oriented research and confidential recommendations for the EU High Representative for Foreign Affairs and Security Policy and EU crisis management institutions, with a focus on EU-UN relations (particularly on mass human rights violations and the Responsibility to Protect), EU-India relations, and international responses to conflict situations, such as Afghanistan, Colombia, Libya and Syria. He also coordinated the ESPAS Pilot Project launched by EU Parliament, Commission and Council to create capacity for identifying global trends and challenges.

Between 2013 and 2014 Luis worked as a Principal Analyst in Knowledge Development with the Center for Crisis Management and Global Operations (CCOMC) at SHAPE, NATO. He provided strategic direction and guidance with regard to analytical tasks and long-term projects in support of the CCOM process, from early warning and conflict situations relevant to NATO.

In 2014 he returned to Madrid to start working with Club de Madrid setting up and leading Next Generation Democracy, a multi-stakeholder global process on the state and future of democracy entailing an analysis of trends and projections in different regions of the world and the drafting of regional agendas as well as a global agenda to advance democracy and human rights. In his role as Senior Analyst of Global and Strategic Affairs, Peral participated in UN Security Council Arria-formula meetings regarding the protection of civilians in armed conflict. A year later, while still working with Club de Madrid, he decided to engage once again the academic field and joined the IE School of International Relations and the Institut Barcelona d’Estudis Internationals to teach “Forced Migration”, “International Law”, “European Security Policy” and “The Future of Democracy: Trends and Risks”.

In 2016, Luis Peral joined Fundación DARA Internacional as Project Manager to design and establish the Refugee Response Index (RRI) to monitor countries’ response to refugees in order to improve relevant national and international action.

In his latest years, apart from significantly contributing to the development of the RRI, he collaborated with esglobal as an analyst and was designated Director of The Future of Syria Project launched by mediatEUr, in which capacity he travelled to Jordan and Lebanon to conduct group discussions with Syrian refugees on the future of their country.

== Publications ==
Peral, L., Los derechos del pueblo kurdo. Algunas propuestas de actuación no gubernamental, IEPALA Editorial, 1998

Peral, L., Éxodos masivos, supervivencia y mantenimiento de la paz, Trotta, 2001 (see main reviews in International Journal of Refugee Law, and Política Exterior)

Peral, L., Paradojas de la no-globalización. Derechos sin fronteras y otros desafíos de la humanidad, Madrid, Lengua de Trapo, Colección Desórdenes, 2008 (Accésit, Primera Edición del Premio de Ensayo de la Fundación Caja Madrid)

Peral, L. (ed), Global Security in a Multipolar World, Chaillot Paper 118, EUISS, Paris, 2009

Peral, L. and Tellis, A. (eds.), Afghanistan 2011-2014 and Beyond: From Support Operations to Sustainable Peace, EUISS-Carnegie Endowment for International Peace, 2011

Peral, L. (ed), Democratic consolidation in Pakistan: the end of exceptionalism? EUISS, 2012
