= Sociology of the body =

Branch of sociology studying the human body

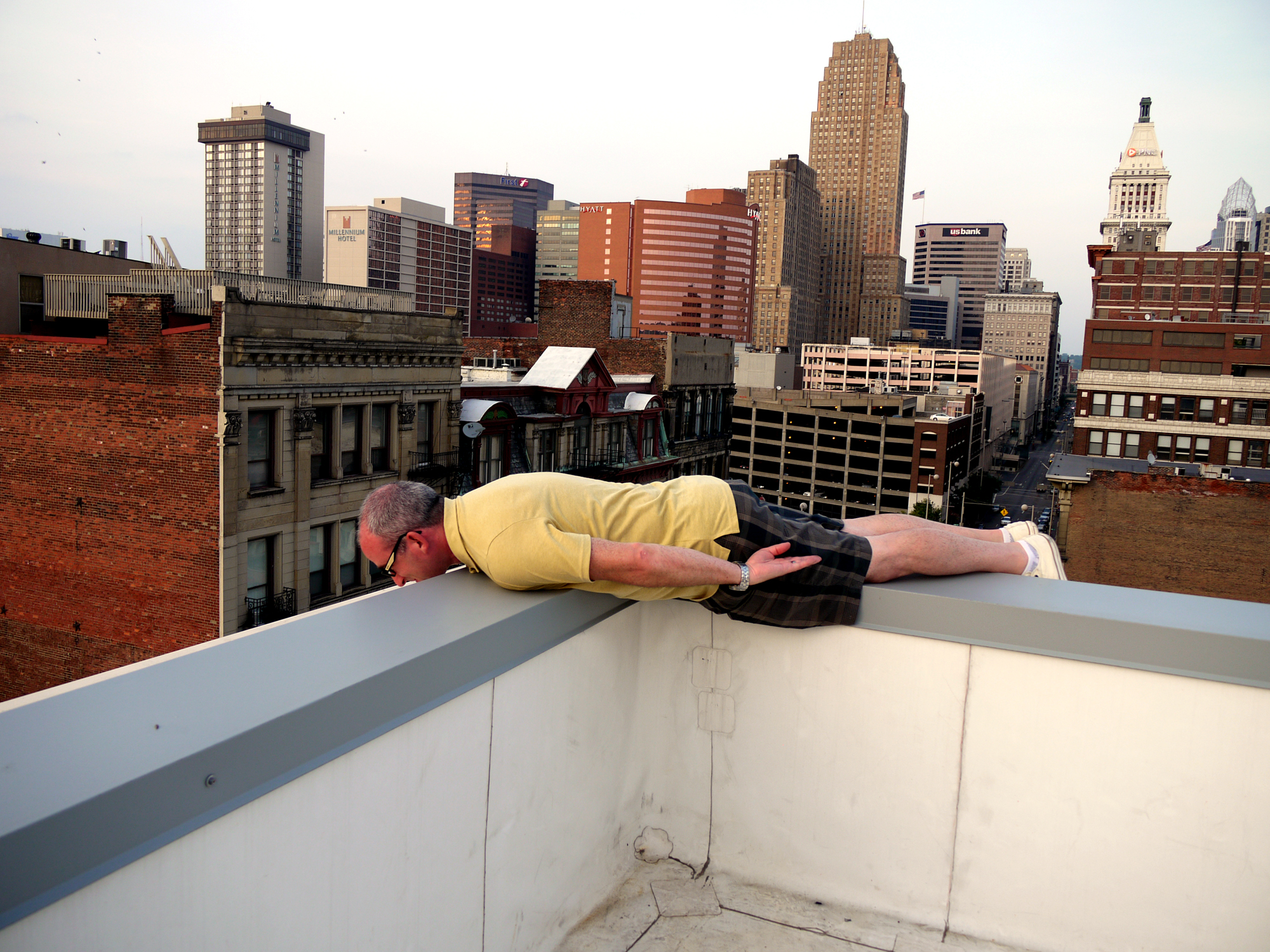
A man performing planking in Ohio, USA.

Sociology of the body is a branch of sociology studying the representations and social uses of the human body in modern societies.

== Early theories ==
According to Thomas Laqueur, prior to the eighteenth century the predominant model for a social understanding of the body was the "one sex model/one flesh model". It followed that there was one model of the body which differed between the sexes and races, for example, the vagina was simply seen as a weaker version of the penis and even thought to emit sperm.

This was changed by the Enlightenment. In the sixteenth century, Europe began to participate in the slave trade and in order to justify this a large quantity of literature was produced showing the deviant sexuality and savagery of the African (Fanon, 1976). In the eighteenth century, the ideas of egalitarianism and universal and inalienable rights were becoming the intellectual norm. However, they could not justify the subordination of women within this theory.

To explain these the biology of incommensurability was created. This essentially claimed that different sexes and races were better adjusted for different tasks and could therefore show the necessity of discrimination and subordination. For example, craniometry was used to show people of African descent to be less evolved than those of European descent (Gould, 1981).

This was also combined with the technological developments which were taking place, leading to people seeing the body as a machine and therefore understandable, classifiable and repairable, one of the first examples of this was the work of William Harvey in the early seventeenth century.

Another early key area of development was the Cartesian Dichotomy. This saw the mind and the body as separated and led to the principle of interaction between the two being an accepted theory on the body until the development of the Structuralist approach in the twentieth century.

== The importance of studying the body ==
Especially important within the sociology of the body tradition is the sociology of health and illness. This is because illness may obviously reduce the level of normal functioning of the body. Also, increasingly people in society believe that illness is prevented by fulfilling activities leading to a healthy body (thus changing one's lifestyle) such as dieting and exercise, as well as avoiding anything that can cause damage to the body, like smoking. Moreover, medical science is now able to alter our bodies through plastic surgery, transplanting organs, reproductive aids and even change in an unborn baby's genetic structure. 1

== Historical physical practices ==
Many researchers have worked on this topic in France. The first was probably Jean-Marie Brohm, writing a book titled Body and Politics in 1974 (Delarge), followed by numerous authors. Georges Vigarello wrote Le Corps redressé, in 1978, Christian Pociello Sports et Société in 1981, André Rauch Le souci du corps in 1983, Jacques Gleyse (fr) Archéologie de l'Education physique au XXe siècle en France, in 1995 and L'Instrumentalisation du corps, in 1997. He is specially working on the topic of links between words and flesh. Various journals are publishing papers in this domain in France: STAPS International Journal of Sport Science and Physical Education, Corps & Culture, and Corps

== Body image and related disorders ==
Sociology of the body has become deeply affected by society and the way in which society views one another, which in turn results in the way in which people, as individuals, view themselves. At one end of the spectrum, there are eating disorders such as anorexia nervosa, bulimia nervosa, binge-eating disorder, and body dysmorphic disorder, and on the other end, there is a growing epidemic of obesity, especially in the US. Both ideals have increased widely over the last few decades due in part to growing mass media coverage in which there are norms within society and the always growing pressure to either look and feel a certain way.

- Anorexia nervosa is an eating disorder marked by the refusal to maintain a healthy weight due to the intense fear of weight gain, with the disturbance in perception of the individuals body shape and weight. This disorder is shown in severely underweight individuals who engage in purging, which includes self-induced vomiting, misuse of laxatives or diuretics, or preferring enemas. People who have anorexia nervosa often think about food/have an appetite however the fear of weight gain dominates the want for food leaving them starving. If these individuals do eat, they search for low calorie foods and also engage in excessive exercise.
- Bulimia nervosa is marked by binge-eating, inappropriate methods to prevent weight gain with negative self-evaluation about body shape and weight. Binge-eating is eating a certain amount of food in a limited amount of time, that is typically too much for most people to eat in one sitting. This happens mostly in private and is triggered by low self-esteem, stress, and depression. After these binge-eating episodes, people purge (self-induced vomiting). People with this disorder are overweight or have a normal body weight.
- Binge eating disorder is similar to bulimia nervosa in the way that people engage in binge-eating episodes, however they do not purge after as patients with bulimia nervosa do.
- Body dysmorphic disorder is an obsessive-compulsive related disorder in which a person is constantly thinking negatively about one's body and engaging in repetitive behaviors to compare themselves to others. These thoughts and behaviors are unwanted, time consuming, and intrusive causing significant stress. This disorder affects men and women, typically starting in adolescents/ teenage years. This disorder may cause an individual to avoid social scenes and isolate themselves from others. People with this disorder often seek treatment such as surgery or skin treatments to approve their appearance.
- All of these disorders are rooted in feelings of shame and desire to have control over one's body (Giddens, Duneier, Appelbaum, and Carr 2009). The individual feels inadequate and imperfect. They may have anxieties about how others perceive them which becomes a focus on feelings about their body. (Giddens, Duneier, Appelbaum, and Carr 2009).
- Obesity is defined as abnormal or excessive fat accumulation that presents a risk to health, according to the World Health Organization. With a BMI ( body mass index) of over 25 is considered overweight, and 30 plus is considered obese. According to the global burden of disease, obesity has now become an epidemic with 4 million people dying each year with obesity being the cause in 2017.
- Reasons thought to be behind obesity vary widely and are often debated. Some believe it has to do with the "population being a statistical artifact, some believe that childhood obesity is due to compositional factors, and then others believe that the problems are due to something called an "obesogenic environment"." Sociologists are perplexed mostly in the persistence of negative attitudes towards overweight and obese individuals.
- From the sociological perspective the interactions that have been seen to show up between society and that of obese individuals is that persons of obesity are more likely to experience employment discrimination, discrimination by health care providers, and the daily experience of teasing, insult, and shame (Giddens, Duneier, Appelbaum, and Carr 2009).

== People in or who influenced sociology of the body ==
- Philippe Ariès
- Alexandre Baril
- Susan Bordo
- Pierre Bourdieu
- Judith Butler
- Peter Conrad
- Mary Douglas
- Norbert Elias
- Frantz Fanon
- Mike Featherstone
- Michel Foucault
- Erving Goffman
- Donna Haraway
- Julia Kristeva
- Thomas W. Laqueur
- Deborah Lupton
- Maurice Merleau-Ponty
- Ann Oakley
- John O'Neill
- Susie Orbach
- Nikolas Rose
- Barbara Katz Rothman
- Dorothy E. Smith
- Bryan Turner

== See also ==
- embodiment theory in anthropology
- sociology of health and illness, a subfield of sociology one of whose characteristics is that it interacts with sociology of the body more than medical sociology does
