= Embodiment theory in anthropology =

Theory in anthropology

Embodiment theory speaks to the ways that experiences are enlivened, materialized, and situated in the world through the body. Embodiment is a relatively amorphous and dynamic conceptual framework in anthropological research that emphasizes possibility and process as opposed to definitive typologies. Margaret Lock identifies the late 1970s as the point in the social sciences where we see a new attentiveness to bodily representation and begin a theoretical shift towards developing an ‘Anthropology of the Body.’

Embodiment-based approaches in anthropology were born of dissatisfaction with dualistic interpretations of humanity that created divisions such as mind/body, nature/culture, and object/subject. Within these dichotomies, the physical body was historically confined to the realm of the ‘natural’ sciences and was not considered to be a subject of study in cultural and social sciences. When the body was studied or considered in social science contexts employing these dualistic frameworks, it was treated as a categorizable, ‘natural’ object with little recognition of its dynamic or subjective potentialities.

Embodiment theory has been developed and expanded by the work of many scholars, as opposed to being credited to a single thinker. The work of Thomas Csordas and Margaret Lock marks some of the earliest explicit applications of embodiment theory in anthropology. More recent edited volumes compiled by Margaret Lock, Judith Farquhar, and Frances Mascia-Lees provide a better window into current applications of embodiment theory in anthropology. The theoretical background of embodiment is an amalgamation of phenomenology, practice theory, feminist theory, and post-structuralist thought. Mary Douglas, Marcel Mauss, Pierre Bourdieu, Maurice Merleau-Ponty, Judith Butler, and Michel Foucault are often cited as key precursory conceptual contributors to embodiment theory.

== Background ==
Embodiment theory stems from a broader project to bridge perceived gaps in anthropological study produced by dualistic ways of thinking about the world using binary groupings such as nature/culture and mind/body. These dualisms trace back to the 17th century philosopher René Descartes. Dualistic thinking about the mind or self as distinct from the body produced research and theory that treated practice, perception, biology, culture, physicality, and cognition separately. Theorists such as Marcel Mauss, Pierre Bourdieu, Maurice Merleau-Ponty, and Michel Foucault grappled with these dualistic framings of the world, but each only contributed a piece of the puzzle. It was not until the 1990s that anthropologists such as Margaret Lock and Thomas Csordas began to attempt to synthesize the intellectual contributions of these precursory thinkers into a cohesive theoretical paradigm of embodiment.

In his 1988 Sterling Award Essay, Thomas Csordas identified two key theorists through which to frame the anthropological paradigm of embodiment: Maurice Merleau-Ponty and Pierre Bourdieu. Merleau-Ponty developed the phenomenological foundations for perception-based embodiment, while Bourdieu's Practice Theory provided the framework for a practice-based embodiment. Csordas saw embodiment theory as a synthesis of these two theoretical approaches. Margaret Lock, publishing about 5 years after Csordas' initial essay, cites a much broader array of scholars and intellectual traditions as contributors to embodiment theory, amongst them Michel Foucault, Mary Douglas, Roy Ellen, Marshal Sahlins, Émile Durkheim, and Robert Hertz (in addition to Merleau-Ponty and Bourdieu).

Feminist theory and critical race theory, categories of social theory utilized heavily in anthropology, have also contributed significantly to the development of embodiment theory as practiced in anthropology. Anthropologists draw broadly from other disciplines in the development of social theory. Not all of the scholars that contributed to embodiment theory as used in anthropology are classified as anthropologists, but all are widely cited in anthropological literature.

=== Cartesian Dualism and the mind/body split ===
René Descartes' mind-body dualism, also known as substance dualism or ‘Cartesian Dualism’, asserts an essential difference between mind and matter. In Descarte's interpretation matter is spatial, but the mind, which is the source of human thought, is immaterial. Within this separation, the self becomes independent of the material body and the two can be studied as separate entities. Substance dualism has served as a pervasive influence in philosophical, anthropological, and sociological theory through the greater part of the 20th century. Not only was the human body studied separately from the thinking, cultural, social self, it was perceived as a universal or essential aspect of being human that did very little to distinguish humanity in relation to the non-human world. Numerous social theorists and philosophers in the latter half of the 20th century sought to bridge the schism created by conceptual dichotomies such as mind/body and nature/culture.

== Theoretical foundations of embodiment theory ==
=== Marcel Mauss ===
In Techniques of the Body, Mauss outlines the ways in which traditional and learned bodily practices allow people to adapt their bodies for social use. Mauss included everything from movement, to dance, to practices of consumption and hygiene, to sexual positions in his definition of bodily 'techniques'. Mauss identifies the body as man's first ‘tool’ and establishes that bodily uses are embedded in both group life and societal history. Mauss saw human actions (and patterns of action) as “psycho-physio-social assemblages” recognizing the intersection of material, cognitive, and cultural influence in human behavior. In a later essay, Mauss established la notion de la personne (the notion of the person/self)—the notion that all humans have self-awareness and a sense of their own individuality. Thomas Csordas notes that while Mauss’ theories served as early precursors to both practice- and perception-based embodiment, the development of the concepts completely independently from one another reproduced cartesian dualisms instead of collapsing them.

=== Maurice Merleau-Ponty ===
Phenomenological embodiment (or perception-based embodiment), is centered around human perception, experience, and the process of objectification. Merleau-Ponty, inspired by Heidegger's notion of ‘being-in-the world’ from “Being and Time”, sought to situate the experience of ‘being-in-the-world’ as the root of human perception and the source of objectivity. According to Merleau-Ponty, there are no objects prior to human perception of them. Humans experience the world and orient themselves within it and in relation to other perceived ‘objects’ through the body. The body then becomes the locus of pre-objective interaction with the external environment—where modality and cognition are integrated and ‘perception’ formed. Phenomenological embodiment collapses subject/object dualisms. In archaeology, phenomenological approaches to lived experience have been used in landscape archaeology to discuss and analyze people's experience of landscape.

=== Pierre Bourdieu ===
Practice-based embodiment draws from Bourdieu's practice theory, most notably the concept of habitus, which Bourdieu developed substantially after the phrase was initially coined by Marcel Mauss in Techniques of the Body. Bourdieu defines habitus as a “principle generating and unifying all practices, the system of inseparably cognitive and evaluative structures which organizes the vision of the world in accordance with the objective structures of a determinate state of the social world.” Habitus can include tastes, dispositions, 'common' knowledge, assumptions, hierarchical structurings of people and concepts, and more. In simpler terms, Bourdieu saw bodily practice as influenced simultaneously by both sensory experience and sociocultural structuring of the self and the external environment. In this interpretation, the socially-informed behavioral environment is internalized in the body and in the psyche, collapsing mind/body dualisms.

=== Michel Foucault ===
Michel Foucault is often cited as an integral influence in the development of theories of embodiment. Specifically, embodiment draws on his concept of biopower as it relates to institutionalized surveillance and state discipline, such as in barracks, factories, schools, and prisons. Foucault invokes the term docile body to describe bodies that have internalized surveillance and discipline enacted upon them past the point of resistance. Foucault asserted two concepts essential to embodiment theory: 1) that the body was a malleable and manipulable entity that was relatively unformed, and 2) that the body was shaped by power exercised upon it within a particular historical context. This established a basis through which mechanisms of power and political history could be embodied by individuals and communities. Foucault specified that power over and control of bodies was focused in “the processes of the activity rather than its result” orienting himself towards a practice-based understanding of the embodiment of power.

== Embodiment and feminist theory ==
Feminist theorists have also played a critical role in the development of embodiment theory as anthropologists understand it today. Shatema Threadcraft attributes the connection between embodiment and feminist theory to the critical role the body plays in constructions of sexuality and gendered difference, as well as the bodily focus of much of the labor that is traditionally ascribed to feminine gender roles (e.g. childbirth, child rearing, aesthetic performance for men, etc.). The relationship between feminist theory, embodiment theory, and the materialist turn in general is fraught because female corporeality has been so tied up in biological determinism, essentialism, and biological fixedness that feminists have been fighting against for decades.

=== Embodiment and second wave feminism ===
Within second wave feminism, there were different approaches to the body, with some advocating for bodily transcendence and others advocating for increased attention to be paid to ‘female’ bodily processes. Simone De Beauvoir, for example, emphasized the constructed nature of the body, asserting that bodies are not born with inherent sex/gender categorization, but bodies “become” women (or men) in The Second Sex. Iris Young notes that De Beauvoir saw bodily concerns and existing configurations as something that women needed to transcend if they sought freedom, and that this transcendence would be realized through reconfiguration of women's bodily uses. Others, like Adrienne Rich, saw women's bodies as something to be celebrated. They encouraged connection to and revaluing of the ‘female’ body. Shatema Threadcraft problematizes both of these approaches: On the one hand, focusing on the body reinforces and naturalizes sex/gender differences, and on the other hand, bodily avoidance/transcendence ignores physical and embodied realities of the diverse multitudes of ‘female’ bodies that exist in the world. Both reproduce nature/culture dichotomies and overtly center the biological or ‘natural’ in feminist thought and activism.

=== Judith Butler ===
Judith Butler approaches embodiment of gender by acknowledging both its materiality and discursivity, conceptualizing a more expansive embodiment in which physical realities of gender are neither ignored nor essentialized. Butler evokes Michel Foucault to analyze the ways that gendered and sexed bodies are materialized via biopower. Butler saw gender as performative and embedded within cultural norms and practices. For Butler, the performance and construction of gender is discursive but not immaterial; Bodies that Matter explores the ways that discourse on sex, gender, and sexuality is physically embodied, generating a normative and ‘natural’ category of sex. In doing this, Butler collapses the dichotomy of the ‘natural’ sexed body and the socially constructed, gendered body that earlier theorists struggled with.

== Racialized embodiment ==
One of the key critiques of second wave feminist approaches to embodiment is the failure of white feminists to consider racialization in the context of embodiment. Numerous Black feminist scholars such as Angela Davis, bell hooks, and Katherine McKittrick have complicated anthropologists' understandings of embodiment with respect to racialized bodies.

=== Angela Davis ===
Davis's work explores the way that Western racial hierarchies complicated and transformed Black women's embodied experiences. In Women, Race, and Class, Davis focuses on the experiences of enslaved Black women, relating these experiences to Black female embodiment in the past and present. Davis highlights that the slave system centered the labor capacities of Black bodies, both male and female, in an undifferentiated capacity. The emphasis on labor capacities of Black women's bodies during slavery has encouraged the continued exploitation of Black women's labor in the present. The orientation of Black women in relation to labor and production also served to alienate them from other aspects of the ‘female’ embodied experience that White feminists placed so much emphasis on such as being a mother or a wife. With her examination, Davis demonstrates how the biopolitical constraints on Black women's bodies and identities are distinct from those imposed on White women and critiques the monolithic representation of the ‘female’ embodied experience espoused by white feminist theorists during the second wave.

=== bell hooks ===
bell hooks examined the sexualization of the Black female body in contemporary pop culture (especially music and film) and how that impacted Black women's embodied experiences. hooks asserts that the sexualization of Black bodies in the West allowed for the desexualization of White bodies, transforming the embodied experiences of both Black and White individuals. hooks elaborates that the fetishized bodies of Black women are problematically associated not only with sexuality, but with sexual deviance, aggression, and activity in the modern Western/American cultural landscape, and connects these associations back to much earlier 19th century representations of Black women in European and Western countries. This is entirely different from the ways that White women's bodies were/are characterized and constructed. Key points from hooks’ analysis include the ‘Othering’ of Black bodies in the establishment of White biopolitical norms, and the high level of constraint but marked lack of protection that characterizes Black women's embodied experiences in the present.

=== Katherine McKittrick ===
Katherine McKittrick's book Demonic Grounds: Black Women and Cartographies of Struggle explores the meanings and intersections of Black women's geographies in relation to their struggle and resistance. In her analysis of the slave auction block in Green Hill as a locus of human geography, she asserts that “physical geography can be mediated by the space of the subject: the body, the self, identity, and subjectivity”, exploring the ways that human geographies can also be embodied or invoke bodily norms, characterizations, and performances. For McKittrick, the auction block is not an empty space, but an active one that at once “ normalizes black pain, commodifies black working-sexual bodies, and potentially motivates resistances to the naturalized place of black femininity.” Places help to situate bodies in relation to their environments and complicate our understandings of peoples lived experiences.

== Embodiment in current anthropological scholarship ==
As Thomas Csordas originally established in his landmark essay, the embodiment paradigm in anthropology is synthetic. It fuses perception- and practice-based embodiment, recognizing that both are integral facets of human experience and ultimately grounded in the body. Other early contributors to current embodiment theory such as Margaret Lock have demonstrated that the intellectual traditions that inform embodiment span an even broader array of social theories and disciplines. This synthetic conceptualization of embodiment recognizes the body as mechanism through which the world is experienced and constructed in tandem.

Embodiment theory illuminates how lived bodies are dynamic, plural, and lack distinct boundaries. As Lock and Farquhar explain: “lived bodies have begun to be comprehended as assemblages of practices, discourses, images, institutional arrangements, and specific places and projects.” Anthropology has come to accept the multiplicity of bodies, recognizing that they are not the universal and strictly biological entities we used to believe them to be. Embodiment theory is an open-ended paradigm, allowing current scholarship to expand topically and methodologically. Recently published edited volumes and scholarly articles relating to embodiment build on this theoretical base by incorporating medical anthropology, technology, commodification, colonialism, sexuality, race, gender, and transnationalism, amongst other subjects.

== See also ==
- Sociology of the body

== Further reading on embodiment in anthropology ==
- Farquhar, Judith, and Margaret Lock, eds. 2007. Beyond the body proper: Reading the anthropology of material life. Durham, NC: Duke Univ. Press.
- Mascia-Lees, Frances E., ed. 2011. A companion to the anthropology of the body and embodiment. Malden, MA: Wiley-Blackwell.
- Mascia-Lees, Frances E.. 2016. The Body and Embodiment in the History of Feminist Anthropology: An Idiosyncratic Excursion through Binaries. In: Lewin, E. and Silverstein, L. ed. Mapping Feminist Anthropology in the Twenty-First Century. Ithaca, NY: Rutgers University Press, pp. 146–167.
- Van Wolputte, Steven. (2004). Hang on to Your Self: Of Bodies, Embodiment, and Selves. Annual Review of Anthropology, 33(1), 251–269.
- Mason, Katherine, and Natalie Boero. 2021. The Oxford Handbook of the Sociology of Body and Embodiment / Edited by Natalie Boero and Katherine Mason. edited by K. Mason and N. Boero. New York: Oxford University Press.
