= Krishan Imdika =

Sri Lankan cricketer (born 1976)

Krishan Imdika (born Saralanthi Pathiranage Krishan Imdika on July 6, 1976) was a Sri Lankan cricketer. He was a right-handed batsman and a left-arm medium-pace bowler who played for Colts Cricket Club. He was born in Gampaha.

Imdika made a single first-class appearance, during the 1998–99 season, against Matara. Batting in the lower order, he did not make an appearance in the first innings and scored a duck in the second.
