= Theory, Culture & Society =

- Discipline: Sociology
- Language: English
- Edited by: Mike Featherstone

Publication details
- History: 1982–present
- Publisher: SAGE Publications
- Frequency: Bimonthly
- Impact factor: 2.810 (2019)

Standard abbreviations
- ISO 4: Theory Cult. Soc.

Indexing
- ISSN: 0263-2764 (print); 1460-3616 (web)
- LCCN: 93646068
- OCLC no.: 38905209

Links
- Journal homepage; Online access; Online archive

Theory, Culture & Society is a peer-reviewed academic journal that was established in 1982 and covers sociology, cultural, and social theory. The journal aims to work "across the borderlines between sociology and cultural studies, the social sciences and the humanities and has moved towards a broader transdisciplinary frame of reference." It is published by SAGE Publications. The editor-in-chief is Mike Featherstone (Goldsmiths, University of London). The journal is also linked to the journal Body & Society and has its own book series featuring the work of theorists.

== Abstracting and indexing ==
The journal is abstracted and indexed in:

- ABI/Inform
- Academic Search
- Anthropological Index Online
- Current Contents/Social and Behavioral Sciences
- FRANCIS
- International Bibliography of Periodical Literature
- International Institute for the Sociology of Law
- MLA International Bibliography
- Social Sciences Citation Index
- Sociological Abstracts
- The Philosopher's Index

According to the Journal Citation Reports, the journal has a 2019 impact factor of 2.810, ranking it 1st out of 45 journals in the category "Cultural Studies".
