= Citizenship Studies =

Academic journal

- Discipline: Sociology
- Language: English
- Edited by: Leah Bassel; Zhonghua Guo; Ian Morrison

Publication details
- History: 1997–present
- Publisher: Taylor & Francis
- Frequency: Bimonthly
- Impact factor: 1.240 (2017)

Standard abbreviations
- ISO 4: Citizsh. Stud.
- NLM: Citizensh Stud

Indexing
- CODEN: CISDFE
- ISSN: 1362-1025 (print); 1469-3593 (web)
- LCCN: sn97044489
- OCLC no.: 937210498

Links
- Journal homepage; Online access; Online archive

Citizenship Studies is a bimonthly peer-reviewed interdisciplinary academic journal covering the study of citizenship and related concepts. It was established in 1997 with Bryan Turner (City University of New York and Australian Catholic University) as founding editor. The editors-in-chief as of 2026 are Leah Bassel (Coventry University), Zhonghua Guo (Nanjing University), and Ian Morrison (American University in Cairo). It is published by Taylor & Francis. According to the Journal Citation Reports, the journal had a 2017 impact factor of 1.240.
