= Journal of Developing Societies =

Academic journal that covers development

- Discipline: Development Studies
- Language: English
- Edited by: Richard L Harris

Publication details
- History: Mar 2002
- Publisher: Sage Publications India Pvt. Ltd.
- Frequency: Quarterly
- Impact factor: 1.1

Standard abbreviations
- ISO 4: J. Dev. Soc.

Indexing
- ISSN: 0169-796X (print); 1745-2546 (web)
- OCLC no.: 865237046

Links
- Journal homepage; Online access; Online archive

The Journal of Developing Societies is a refereed international journal on development and social change not only in 'developing' countries but also the 'developed' societies of the world. It provides an interdisciplinary forum for the publication of theoretical perspectives, research findings, case studies, policy analyses and normative critiques on the issues, problems and policies of both mainstream and alternative approaches to development.

The journal is a member of the Committee on Publication Ethics (COPE).

This journal is edited by Richard L Harris, who oversees the publication and ensures the quality and relevance of its scholarly content.

== Abstracting and indexing ==
The journal is abstracted and indexed in:

- ProQuest: International Bibliography of the Social Sciences (IBSS)
- SCOPUS
- Research Papers in Economics (RePEc)
- DeepDyve
- Portico
- Dutch-KB
- Pro-Quest-RSP
- EBSCO
- OCLC
- Ohio
- ICI
- ProQuest-Illustrata
- EBSCO: Australia/New Zealand Reference Centre
- Sociological Abstracts - ProQuest
- Worldwide Political Science Abstracts - ProQuest
- Thomson Reuters: Emerging Sources Citation Index (ESCI)
- J-Gate
- CABELLS Journalytics
- Clarivate Analytics: Emerging Sources Citation Index (ESCI)
- ProQuest: Research Papers in Economics (RePEc)
- UGC-CARE (GROUP II)
