= Jakob Krischan =

Austrian politician and estate worker

Jakob Krischan (18 July 1894 – 9 August 1970) was an Austrian politician and estate worker. He was a member of the State Parliament of Lower Austria from 1934 to 1938. He also became representative of agriculture and forestry and worked with the interests of farm workers in mind. Krischan was born in Kněždub, Moravia and died in Vienna, Austria.
