= Valley of the Kings (video game) =

1982 video game

- Publisher(s): Dynacomp
- Designer(s): Thomas M. Krischan
- Platform(s): Atari 8-bit
- Release: 1982

Valley of the Kings, subtitled A Graphics Adventure, is a video game written by Thomas M. Krischan for Atari 8-bit computers and published by Dynacomp in 1982.

== Gameplay ==
Valley of the Kings is a game in which the player navigates through maze-like passages in ancient Egypt, obtaining valuable objects and fighting enemies.

== Reception ==
David Stone reviewed the game for Computer Gaming World, and stated that "since it's [sic] play-value is not derived from solving riddles and puzzles, but rather from maneuvering the onscreen character, there's plenty of fun to be had by replaying the adventure to try to beat your last score."
