= Jean Krisch =

American theoretical cosmologist and astrophysicist

Jean Peck Krisch (born 1939) is an American theoretical cosmologist and astrophysicist whose research concerns the theory of general relativity and the behavior of relativistic stars. She is Arthur F. Thurnau Professor Emerita of Physics at the University of Michigan.

== Education and career ==
Krisch graduated from the University of Maryland, College Park in 1960 and completed a Ph.D. at Cornell University in 1965. Her dissertation was A Calculation of the Baryon – Vector Meson Mixing Parameters.

She became a faculty member at the University of Michigan in 1974, was named the Arthur F. Thurnau Professor of Physics in 1991, and retired to become Thurnau Professor Emerita in 2017.

== Recognition ==
Krisch was president of the council of the Society of Physics Students for 1991–1993, and president of Sigma Pi Sigma, a US honor society for physics, for 1994–1996. She became a Fellow of the American Physical Society in 1998, "for leadership and national contributions to the Society of Physics Students, effective and innovative undergraduate physics teaching, including to preservice elementary teachers, and for successful mentorship of women graduate students."
