= Nico Krisch =

Nico Krisch (born April 7, 1972) is a legal scholar, specializing in international law, constitutional theory, and global governance. He is professor at the Graduate Institute of International and Development Studies in Geneva. Previously, he was research professor at the ICREA, Institut Barcelona d'Estudis Internacionals, and a Fellow at the Hertie School of Governance in Berlin. He has also been a professor of international law at the Hertie School, a senior lecturer at the Law Department of the London School of Economics and Political Science, and a research fellow at Merton College (Oxford), New York University School of Law and the Max Planck Institute for International Law in Heidelberg. He has also been a visiting professor of law at Harvard Law School.

Krisch holds a Ph.D. in law from the University of Heidelberg and a Diploma of European Law of the Academy of European Law at the European University Institute in Florence, Italy. He is the author of Selbstverteidigung und kollektive Sicherheit (Self-defense and Collective Security, 2001) and of articles on the United Nations, hegemony in international law, and the legal order of global governance. He has been a co-founder of the Global Administrative Law project at NYU Law School. His most recent book, Beyond Constitutionalism: The Pluralist Structure of Postnational Law (2010), was awarded the 2012 Certificate of Merit of the American Society of International Law and the inaugural Max Planck-Cambridge Prize for International Law. Krisch is also a member of the Council of the International Society for Public Law.
