= Joseph Krische =

American soccer player

Joseph "Joe" Krische is a former U.S. soccer defender. Various sources, including the National Soccer Hall of Fame, misspell Krische's name as Kriesch and Kriesche. He earned three caps with the U.S. national team in 1960 and 1961.

== Club career ==
Krische played for Blau-Weiss Gottschee of the New York German American Soccer League (GASL) for nineteen seasons with twelve of those seasons coming in the GASL First Division. In 1960, he also played for New York in the International Soccer League.

== National team ==
Krische played two World Cup qualification games in November 1960. On November 6, 1960, the U.S. played to a 3–3 tie with Mexico followed by a 3–0 loss to Mexico seven days later. His third, and final, game with the national team came in a 2–0 loss to Colombia on February 5, 1961.

He served for several years as the president of the Blau-Weiss Gottschee Soccer Club.
