= Mike Featherstone =

British sociologist

Mike Featherstone is a British sociologist. He is director of the Theory, Culture & Society Centre and the Professor of Sociology at Goldsmiths, University of London, UK, and is visiting professor in Barcelona, Geneva, Kyoto, Recife, São Paulo, Tokyo and Vancouver. He has been influential in generating international funding and organizing conferences such as the Ubiquitous Media Conference (2005) in Tokyo. He is a founding editor of the journal Theory, Culture & Society (1982–) and the Theory, Culture & Society book series (1991–). He is also the editor-in-chief of the journal, Body & Society (1995–).

He was born in 1946 and attended Durham University (BA, MA) and Utrecht University (PhD).

== Works ==
Featherstone's main research interests are social theory and cultural theory, consumer culture and global culture, ageing and the body. His books and articles have been translated into sixteen languages.

Author

- Consumer Culture and Postmodernism (1991, second edition 2007)
- Undoing Culture: Globalization, Postmodernism and Identity (1995)

Co-author

- Surviving Middle Age (1982)

Editor

- Postmodernism (1988)
- Global Culture (1990)
- Georg Simmel (1991)
- Cultural Theory and Cultural Change (1992)
- Love and Eroticism (1999)
- Body Modification (2000)

Co-editor

- The Body: Social Process and Cultural Theory (1991)
- Global Modernities (1995)
- Cyberspace/Cyberbodies/Cyberpunk: Cultures of Technological Embodiment (1995)
- Images of Ageing (1995)
- Simmel on Culture (1997)
- Spaces of Culture (1999)
- Recognition and Difference (2002)
- Automobilities (2005)
- Problematizing Global Knowledge (2006)
