= Journal of Classical Sociology =

- Discipline: Sociology
- Language: English
- Edited by: Bryan S. Turner, Simon Susen

Publication details
- History: 2001-present
- Publisher: SAGE Publications
- Frequency: Quarterly

Standard abbreviations
- ISO 4: J. Class. Sociol.

Indexing
- ISSN: 1468-795X (print); 1741-2897 (web)
- LCCN: 2001262121
- OCLC no.: 609932023

Links
- Journal homepage; Online access; Online archive

The Journal of Classical Sociology is a quarterly peer-reviewed academic journal covering all aspects of classical sociology. The editors-in-chief are Bryan S. Turner (City University of New York) and Simon Susen (City University London). The journal was established in 2001 and is currently published by SAGE Publications.

== Abstracting and indexing ==
The journal is abstracted and indexed in:

- Academic Search Premier
- Applied Social Sciences Index & Abstracts
- Scopus
