= Body & Society =

- Discipline: Anthropology
- Language: English
- Edited by: Mike Featherstone

Publication details
- History: 1995-present
- Publisher: SAGE Publications
- Frequency: Quarterly
- Impact factor: 2.900 (2017)

Standard abbreviations
- ISO 4: Body Soc.

Indexing
- ISSN: 1357-034X (print); 1460-3632 (web)
- OCLC no.: 39082598

Links
- Journal homepage; Online access; Online archive

Body & Society is a quarterly peer-reviewed academic journal that publishes scholarly research on the body. The journal was established in 1995 and is published by SAGE Publications on behalf of the TCS Centre, formerly based at Nottingham Trent University and now operating primarily out of Goldmiths, University of London.

== Abstracting and indexing ==
Body & Society is abstracted and indexed in Scopus and the Social Sciences Citation Index. According to the Journal Citation Reports, its 2017 impact factor is 2.900, ranking it 10th out of 146 journals in the "Sociology" category.
