= Siege of Poitiers (1569) =

Battle

Siege of Poitiers 1569
- Part of the Third French War of Religion (1568–1570)
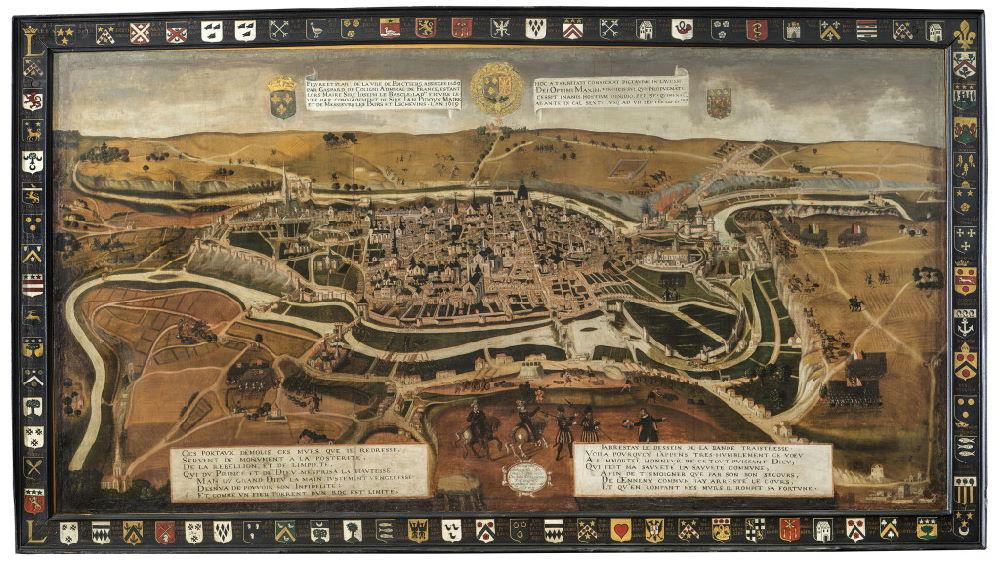
- François Nautré, The Siege of Poitiers, 1619
| Date | 24 July – 7 September 1569 |
| Location | Poitiers, Vienne |
| Result | Catholic victory |

Belligerents
| Huguenots | City guard |

Commanders and leaders
| Admiral Gaspard II de Coligny | Guy de Daillon, Maixent Poitevin and Joseph Le Bascle |

Strength
| 10,000 infantry, 8,000–9,000 cavalry | 3,000–4,000 men at arms |

The siege of Poitiers was a siege of the French city of Poitiers in summer 1569 as part of the French Wars of Religion. By that time, the city was a Catholic stronghold faithful to Charles IX of France, though Jean Calvin had preached there in 1534 and it had taken the Protestant side from May to July 1563 before being recaptured by the Catholic Royalist party.

== Context ==
The city was an important regional capital in Poitou near La Rochelle, the Protestant capital from 1567 onwards. The situation had been particularly unstable in summer 1568 when the Royalist armies had threatened to cut off the Huguenot leaders, who decided to take refuge in La Rochelle. Louis Ier de Bourbon-Condé and Admiral de Coligny fled to their estates in Burgundy on 28 September 1568.

Western French provinces such as Aunis, Angoumois and Poitou saw continual confrontations between Protestants and Catholics, but for a time Poitiers itself remained undamaged despite being close to these conflicts. However, the prince de Condé was killed at the Battle of Jarnac on 13 March 1569 and Jeanne d'Albret instead placed her forces under the 16-year-old Henri Ier de Bourbon-Condé and the 15-year-old Henry of Navarre. Repeated Catholic defeats in June and July 1569 left Poitou open to the Protestants. Capturing Poitiers itself would grant them access to the Loire and Poitou's governor Guy de Daillon was away besieging Niort from 20 June 1569 onwards, a siege which dragged on. However, when Coligny's troops approached, Lude decided to retire to Poitiers and dig in.

== Course ==
The size of the opposing forces is uncertain, but Martin Liberge asserts the Catholics fielded between 3,000 and 4,000 infantrymen, cavalry and armed civilians. On 12 July 1569, Henry I of Lorraine, Duke of Guise and his brother the Marquis of Mayenne arrived to reinforce Poitiers with 800 cavalrymen, including 400 Italian lancers. de Coligny had around 10,000 infantry and between 8,000 and 9,000 cavalry as well as an artillery force of unknown size.

From 26 to 30 July Coligny built his camp and dug siegeworks around the city. On 27 July he began to bombard the city's castle, but it suffered no damage. The Protestants built a bridge over the river. On 31 July the defenders used all sorts of traps and projectiles to repulse those attacking through breaches in the city wall.

The siege was at its fiercest in August. Early in the month, the Protestant cannon fired on the city wall and the tour du pont Joubert was destroyed. Coligny tried to breach the wall near the tour du pont Joubert, firing on the defensive structures for three days. Over the course of August, the Protestants managed to make three breaches in the city wall but failed at the pont Saint-Cyprien. Coligny's force then formed up for open battle on the dunes, confusing the Catholic defenders. The defenders won an important victory defending the Tison mill, but towards the end of the month the Protestants continued to bombard Pré-Abbesse from the third breach, getting as far as the église Sainte-Radegonde. On 25 August both armies stopped, just before the Protestant camp was ravaged by dysentery, killing many of its leaders.

Early in September the defenders made a successful sortie against the Protestant positions in the vineyard overlooking Rochereuil, getting as far as the west gates of the suburb. Protestant counter-attacks were resisted and on 7 September the royal army arrived to lay siege to the Protestants before Châtellerault. According to Liberge, the inhabitants of Poitiers heard the artillery fire against the Huguenots and Coligny's troops left the siege to go to defend Châtellerault, later fighting at the major Protestant defeat at Moncontour. The city then held a thanksgiving procession on 8 September and an annual procession in honour of its patron saints Radegund, Hilary of Poitiers and the Virgin Mary was held thereafter.

Peace did not immediately return after the siege was lifted, though Poitiers' successful resistance was interpreted as a sign of divine providence opening the way to a new era of victories for the most orthodox Catholic forces. The damage from the siege was repaired little by little, though the abbey of Saint-Cyprien was abandoned and demolished in 1574.

== Bibliography (in French) ==
- Marianne Carbonnier-Burkard and Patrick Cabanel Une histoire des protestants en France, Desclée de Brouwer, Paris, 1998
- Nicole Vray, La guerre des religions dans la France de l’Ouest : Poitou, Aunis, Saintonge, 1534-1610, Geste Éditions, 1997
- Henri Dubief and Jacques Poujol, La France protestante, Histoire et Lieux de mémoire, Max Chaleil éditeur, Montpellier, 1992, rééd. 2006, p. 45
- Hiernard Jean, Le siège de Poitiers en 1569, La Crèche: la Geste, 2019.
- Aubigné, Histoire Universelle, 11 vol., 1616–1630
- Davila, Histoire des guerres civiles de France, trad. de l'italien, Paris, 1644
