= Société de l'histoire du protestantisme français =

French scholarly society

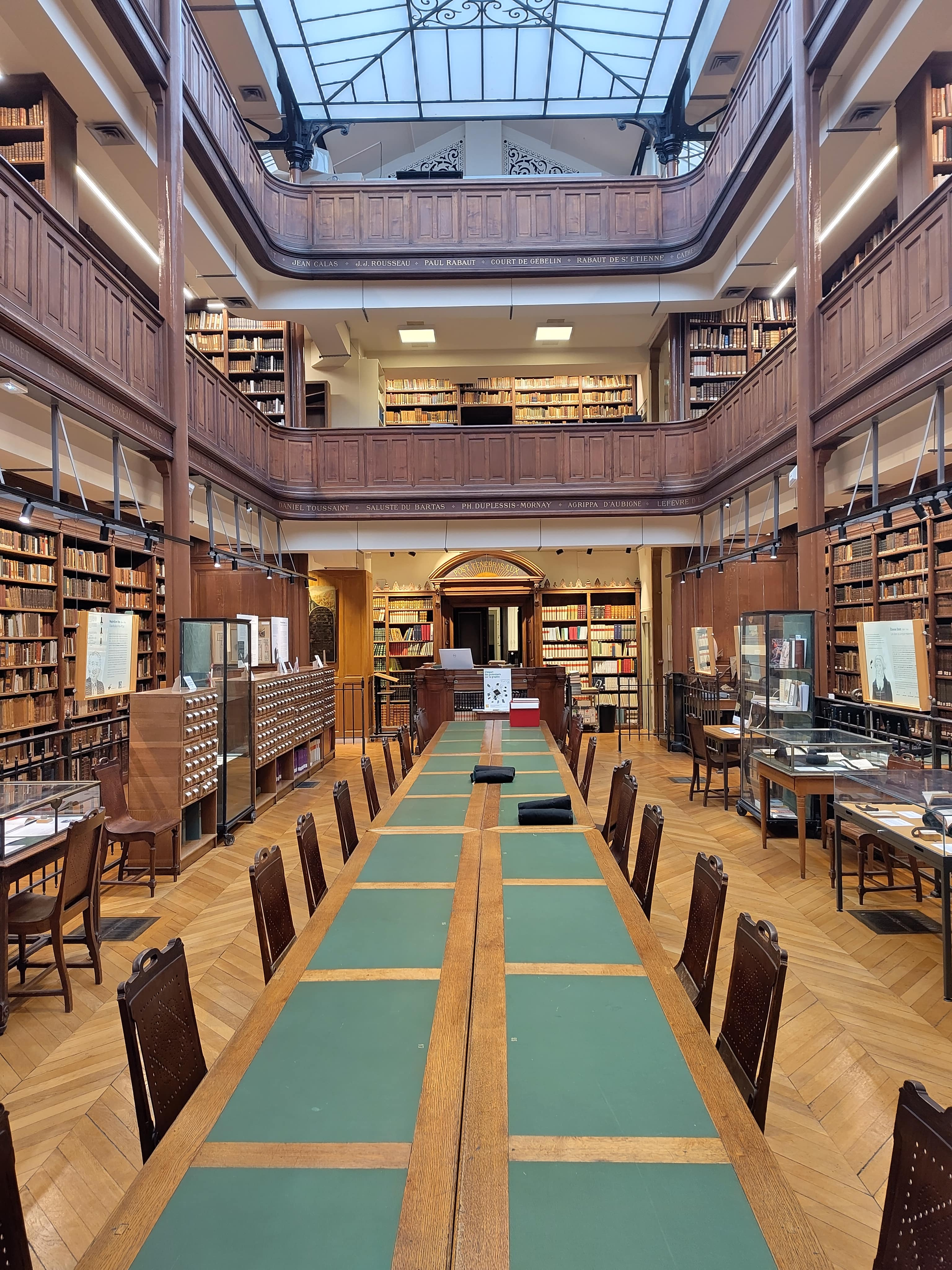
Library of the SHPF, 54, rue des Saints-Pères.

The Société de l'histoire du protestantisme français (SHPF) is a French scholarly society which researches, collects, studies and publishes on the history of Protestantism in France. It was founded in 1852 with that aim by the historian Charles Read, making it one of France's oldest such societies.

Since 1885 it has been based at 54 rue des Saints-Pères in Paris, in a building built in 1869-1873 by Louis-Auguste Boileau inspired by department store architecture.

== Activities ==
Since its foundation it has published the peer-reviewed Bulletin de la Société de l'histoire du protestantisme français four times a year. From 1985 to 2015 André Encrevé was its chief editor and it was renamed the Revue d'histoire du protestantisme in 2016. Its current chief editor is Hubert Bost. Thirty-nine issues between 1903 and 1940 are available on Gallica.

It also does important work on genealogy and publishes the review Cahiers du centre de généalogie protestante three times a year on that topic. The society's library was formed in 1866 and has over 100,000 works, many from the library of Charles Augustin Sainte-Beuve, particularly the works there on Jansenism. Its 21 by 11 metre reading room with a glass roof is surrounded by two galleries.

== Affiliates ==
=== Museums ===
It runs or supports several museums on the history of Protestantism in France :

- musée Jean-Calvin in Noyon (Oise),
- musée de la France protestante de l'Ouest, Château du Bois-Tiffrais in Monsireigne (Vendée),
- musée du protestantisme dauphinois at Le Poët-Laval (Drôme)
- musée du Vivarais protestant (Maison de Pierre et Marie Durand) in Pranles (Ardèche)

It also contributes to the musée du Désert, founded in 1911 in the birthplace of the leading camisard Rolland, in Mas Soubeyran, Mialet

=== Other ===
- Huguenot memorial in fort de l'île Sainte-Marguerite à Cannes ;
- La Boîte à Cailloux in Hesbécourt (Somme).

== Partners ==
- The Société d'histoire du protestantisme de Nîmes et du Gard (SHPNG), founded in 1977,, est affiliée à la SHPF ; which produced its own Bulletin from 2002 to 2011.

== Presidents ==
- Charles Read (1852-1865)
- Fernand de Schickler (1865-1909)
- Frank Puaux (1909-1922), pastor and history professor at the Protestant Faculty of Theology in Paris
- John Viénot (1922-1933), pastor and history professor at the Protestant Faculty of Theology in Paris
- Raoul Patry (1934-1935), pastor and professor at the Protestant Faculty of Theology in Paris
- François de Witt-Guizot (1935-1939)
- Jacques Pannier (1939-1945), pastor, librarian of the society
- Charles Schmidt (1946-1949), inspecteur general of libraries
- Gabriel Puaux (1949-1963), French ambassador
- Jacques Allier (1963-1978)
- François Méjan (1978-1982)
- Jacques Bompaire (1982-1990)
- Roger Zuber (1990-1996)
- Laurent Theis (1996-2002)
- Thierry du Pasquier (2002-2012) ·
- Isabelle Sabatier (2012-2023).
- Henri Zuber (since 2023)

== Bibliography (in French) ==
- "1852-2002 : Numéro spécial du cent-cinquantenaire de la SHPF", Bulletin de la Société de l'histoire du protestantisme français, vol. 148, 2002
- Christian Amalvi; Marianne Carbonnier-Burkard (2005). "La Bibliothèque de la Société de l'histoire du protestantisme français". Les lieux de l'histoire. Paris: Armand Colin. p. 113-117. ISBN 9782200267223..
- Patrick Harismendy (2000). "« Post tenebras lux » ou cent ans de la Société de l'histoire du protestantisme français". Revue d'histoire de l'Église de France. p. 726..
- Roger-Armand Weigert (October–December 1952). "Cent ans d'érudition nationale : La Société de l'histoire du protestantisme français (1852-1952)". Bulletin de la Société de l'Histoire du Protestantisme Français (1903-). 99. Bulletin de la Société de l'histoire du protestantisme Français: 219–250. JSTOR 24297981..
- « Société de l’histoire du protestantisme français », notice on Musée protestant
