= Carbonnier =

Carbonnier is a surname of Franco-German origin, in addition to Austria, Germany and Switzerland. The name may refer to:

== People ==
- Jean Carbonnier (1908–2003), one of the most important French jurists of the 20th century
- Marianne Carbonnier-Burkard (born 1949), historian
- Pierre Carbonnier (7 August 1828 – 8 April 1883), French scientist, ichthyologist, fish breeder and public Aquarium director
