= Marianne Carbonnier-Burkard =

French historian

Marianne Carbonnier-Burkard (born 16 April 1949) is a French historian of modern Protestantism and honorary docent at the Faculté de théologie protestante de Paris. She is vice-president of the Société de l'histoire du protestantisme français and a member of the Comité consultatif national d'éthique pour les sciences de la vie et de la santé (2013–2017).

== Life ==
Born in Poitiers, she and the magistrate Irène Carbonnier were both daughters of lawyer Jean Carbonnier and Madeleine Hugues, the latter being a granddaughter of Edmond Hugues, founder of the Musée du Désert

In 1974 she gained a doctorate in the third cycle of the history of philosophy at the université Paris IV with a thesis entitled Émigration et sécession pour cause religieuse, étude de philosophie politique (Emigration and secession for religious reasons, a study of political philosophy). She then became a curator at the Bibliothèque nationale de France (1976–1986) before starting a teaching and research career in the faculté de théologie protestante de Paris (Institut protestant de théologie) (1986–2012). She thus coordinated the activities of the Groupe de recherches en histoire des protestantismes and in 2015 became an associate member of the Laboratoire d’études sur les monothéismes.

She is also assistant-curator at the Musée du Désert, the main museum of French Protestantism, located at Mas Soubeyran in Mialet, as well as vice-president of the Société de l'histoire du protestantisme français.

== Publications ==
- Une histoire des protestants en France : XVI^{e} – XX^{e} siècles, avec Patrick Cabanel, Paris, Desclée de Brouwer, 1998
- Comprendre la révolte des camisards, Rennes : Éd. Ouest-France, 2008
- Jean Calvin, une vie, Paris, Desclée de Brouwer, 2009
- La révolte des camisards, Rennes, Éd. Ouest-France, 2012
- with Jean Baubérot, Histoire des Protestants : Une minorité en France (XVI^{e} – XXI^{e} siècle), Paris, Ellipses, 2016, 576 p. (ISBN 978-2-340-01521-0).

== Bibliography ==
- Patrick Cabanel, « Marianne Carbonnier-Burkard », in Patrick Cabanel and André Encrevé (ed.s), Dictionnaire biographique des protestants français de 1787 à nos jours, tome 1 : A-C, Les Éditions de Paris Max Chaleil, Paris, 2015, p. 566-567 ISBN 978-2846211901
