= André Chamson =

French writer (1900–1983)

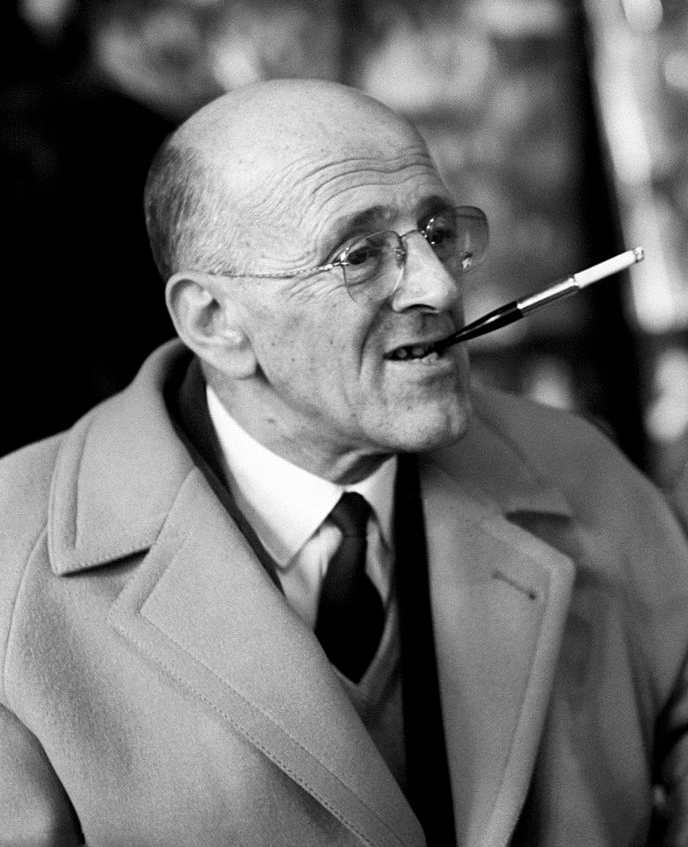
- Andre Chamson in 1962
- Born: 6 June 1900; Nîmes, Gard, France
- Died: 9 November 1983 (aged 83); Paris, France
- Spouse: Lucie Mazauric (m. 1924)
- Children: Frédérique Hébrard

André Chamson (6 June 1900 – 9 November 1983) was a French archivist, novelist and essayist. He was nominated for the Nobel Prize in Literature.

He was the father of the novelist Frédérique Hébrard.

== Biography ==
Chamson was born at Nîmes, Gard. Having studied at the École des chartes, as an archiviste paléographe (graduation 1924), he was the founder-director of the journal Vendredi and a museum curator before the Second World War. In July 1937 he attended the Second International Writers' Congress, the purpose of which was to discuss the attitude of intellectuals to the war in Spain, held in Valencia, Barcelona and Madrid and attended by many writers including André Malraux, Ernest Hemingway, Stephen Spender and Pablo Neruda. After the War he was on the editorial board of the magazine Europe at the time of its revival in 1946; he was a curator at the Musée du Petit Palais, and (from 1959 to 1971) director of the Archives de France.

He was President of PEN International, the worldwide association of writers, from 1956 to 1959.

He was elected to the Académie Française on 17 May 1956 by 18 votes – including Jules Romains, André Maurois and Georges Duhamel – to succeed Ernest Seillière. In 1958, he was elected mainteneur of the Académie des Jeux floraux.

A Protestant, generous and sociable in both his life and his writing, he set most of his tales in the Cévennes, his birthplace (Roux le bandit, 1925; Les Hommes de la route, 1927; Le Crime des justes, 1928; L'Auberge de l'Abîme, 1933; La Neige et la Fleur, 1951; La Tour de Constance, 1970). He spoke seven times at the Assemblées du Désert (1935, 1954, 1958, 1967, 1972, 1975 and 1979), an annual gathering of Protestants held on the first Sunday of September on the grounds of the Musée du Désert, at the village of Mas Soubeyran in the Gard department. During the Second World War he was in charge of large sections of the Louvre; he succeeded in hiding some of the most famous art treasures, including The Venus of Milo near Valencay, in a chateau, in the provinces. Later in the War he joined the armed Resistance and became a major in the French units under General de Lattre de Tassigny Chamson died in Paris in 1983. He is buried with his wife near Pic de Barette in Valleraugue, overlooking the Taleyrac valley.

Non-profit organization positions
Preceded by Charles Langbridge Morgan	International President of PEN International; 1956–1959	Succeeded by Alberto Moravia
