= Jacques Bompaire =

20th-century French Hellenist and scholar of ancient Greek

- Born: 16 January 1924; Angers
- Died: 6 May 2009 (aged 85); Le Chesnay (Yvelines)
- Occupation: Hellenist

Jacques Bompaire (16 January 1924 – 6 May 2009) was a 20th-century French Hellenist and scholar of ancient Greek and Greek literature of the Roman and Byzantine period.

== Biography ==
A former student of the École normale supérieure (class 1943), he volunteered in 1944 for the remainder of World War II. Received first to the Agrégation de Lettres Classiques in 1947, he was elected a member of the French School at Athens in 1948. He devoted his doctoral research on Lucian, and in 1956 supported a State thesis entitled Lucien écrivain. Imitation et création. His complementary thesis, the same year, is devoted in turn to the Praktika de Xéropotamou, he published and commented census acts regarding land area of Xeropotamou monastery on Mount Athos during the Byzantine period.

He presided the Association Guillaume Budé from 1989 to 1996, then became its honorary president until his death. He was President of the Société de l'histoire du protestantisme français from 1982 to 1990.

== Main works ==
=== Festschrift ===
Opôra, la belle saison de l'hellénisme: Études de littérature antique. Ancient literature studies offered to the rector Jacques Bompaire, Presses de l'université Paris-Sorbonne, Paris, 2001 (complete bibliography inserted).

=== Author ===
- 1974 : La paléographie grecque et byzantine, introduction in collaboration with Jean Irigoin, Colloques internationaux du CNRS, n° 559, Paris, 21–25 October 1974
- 1981 : « Photius et la Seconde Sophistique, after the Bibliothèque », in Travaux et Mémoires, vol. VIII, (p. 79–86).
- 1993 : « Diplomatique et rhétorique à l'époque de Michel VIII Paléologue, 1258-1282 », in Jean-Pierre Bardet and Madeleine Foisil (under the direction of), La vie, la mort, la foi, le temps, mélanges offerts à Pierre Chaunu, Presses Universitaires de France, (p. 671–681)
- Lucien écrivain. Imitation et création. Paris: Éditions Robert Laffont. 1958. ISBN 9782221109021.
- 2000 : Lucien écrivain. Imitation et création, Les Belles Lettres

=== Scientific editor ===
==== Works by Lucian ====
- Œuvres, text established and translated into French by Jacques Bompaire, Paris, Les Belles Lettres, Collection des universités de France:
  - Volume 1, 2003, (includes Phalaris A, Phalaris B, Hippias, Dionysos, Héraclès , À propos de l'ambre ou des cygnes, Éloge de la mouche, Nigrinos, Vie de Démonax and La salle).
  - Volume 2, 2003, (includes Éloge de la patrie, Les « longue-vie », Histoires vraies A, Histoires vraies B, Qu'il ne faut pas croire à la légère à la calomnie, Le jugement des voyelles, Le banquet ou les Lapithes, Le pseudosophiste ou le soléciste, La traversée pour les enfers ou le tyran and Zeus confondu).
  - Volume 3, 2003, (includes Zeus tragédien, Le songe ou le coq, Prométhée, Icaroménippe ou l'homme qui va au-dessus des nuages and Timon ou le misanthrope).
  - Volume 4, 2008, (includes Charon ou les observateurs, Les vies des philosophes à l'encan, Les ressuscités ou les pêcheurs and La double accusation ou les tribunaux).

== Bibliography ==
- Patrick Cabanel, « Jacques Bompaire », in Patrick Cabanel et André Encrevé (dir.), Dictionnaire biographique des protestants français de 1787 à nos jours, tome 1 : A-C, Les Éditions de Paris Max Chaleil, Paris, 2015, (p. 359–360) ISBN 978-2846211901

Preceded by Raymond Polin	3rd president of the Paris-Sorbonne University; 1981–1988	Succeeded by Michel Meslin
