= Charlemagne and France: A Thousand Years of Mythology =

1997 book by Robert Morrissey

- Cover of the English edition
- Author: Robert Morrissey
- Original title: L'Empereur à la barbe fleurie: Charlemagne dans la mythologie et l'histoire de France
- Translator: Catherine Tihanyi
- Language: French
- Series: Bibliothèque des histoires
- Subject: Charlemagne in French history, literature and political thought
- Genre: Cultural history
- Publisher: Éditions Gallimard
- Publication date: 1997
- Publication place: France
- English publication date: 2003
- Media type: Print
- Pages: 437 (French), 391 (English)
- Awards: Prix Chateaubriand (1997)
- ISBN: 2-07-073127-8
- OCLC: 36663806
- Dewey Decimal: 944/.014/092
- LC Class: DC73 .M7513 2003

Charlemagne and France: A Thousand Years of Mythology is a book by the American scholar of French literature and cultural history Robert Morrissey about the ways in which Charlemagne was represented and invoked in France from the ninth century to the twentieth. Morrissey wrote it in French, and it was first published by Gallimard in 1997 as L'Empereur à la barbe fleurie: Charlemagne dans la mythologie et l'histoire de France. Catherine Tihanyi's English translation was published by the University of Notre Dame Press in 2003.

Morrissey uses chronicles, epic poetry, historiography, legal and political writing, art and philology, to argue that the emperor's image served across time both to legitimize French rulers and to support their critics, that it became central to eighteenth-century debates on the monarchy and the nation, and that it lost its hold after the Franco-Prussian War.

The French edition received the Prix Chateaubriand for history in 1997.

== Summary ==
The book is not a biography of Charlemagne, but rather a history of what the French have made of the Emperor: a topos, a cultural commonplace from which to launch competing claims of legitimacy.

Morrissey begins his study with three accounts of the opening of Charlemagne’s tomb in Aachen: those of Chateaubriand in the Mémoires d'outre-tombe, Alfred Rethel's 1847 painting, Otto III, bowing his head before the enthroned body, its face covered by a shroud, and the eleventh-century chronicle of Novalesa. Morrissey views Rethel's shroud-like veil. He writes that he is "more concerned with examining what has been drawn on the veil than in looking beneath it". Treating the figure of Charlemagne as a topos "located at the juncture of history, myth, and poetry", and he reads chronicles, epics, histories, legal treatises, pamphlets, paintings, novels and philology side by side in their chronological context. The figure's "extraordinary plasticity", Morrissey argues, and its position as a ruler who preceded France and was claimed by other nations, allowed it both to confer legitimacy on established power and to justify demands for radical change in the name of lost origins. He presents the study as an attempt to break a French silence about an emperor whose national significance had largely been conceded to Germany.

Morrissey sets out the history of the French representation of Charlemagne in two cycles of approximately equal length, running from the ninth century to the end of the sixteenth in the first, and from the seventeenth to the twentieth in the second.

In the Royal Frankish Annals where Einhard’s biography is modelled on Suetonius, in Notker the Stammerer’s anecdote about the emperor, and in Hincmar’s treatise on the organization of the palace under Charlemagne, Morrissey finds the essential elements of the image of the magnanimous emperor. He was at once a conquering warrior and protector of Christendom; a leader who promoted justice and was responsible for a renewal of the arts and letters; a protector of the poor and the founder of schools where he chose the most diligent of poor pupils over the idle you sons of the nobility; a ruler who governed through assemblies of his magnates.

The second chapter goes on to study the old French epic poetry (chansons de geste) from the Song of Roland with its depiction of Charlemagne as a figure representing a fragile equilibrium between feudal and theocentric ideologies, to the songs of baronial revolt where the emperor is portrayed in various unflattering ways – be it greedy, drunken, unjust or vindictive. Depicting him becomes a privileged means of exploring the limits of royal authority and power, with Charlemagne as "a privileged mirror of the prince,” be the image positive or negative. In the Pseudo-Turpin chronicle, Charlemagne gives the whole of France to abbey of Saint-Denis.

Late medieval compilations of chronicles, including the thirteenth-century Grandes Chroniques de France fixed a stable image and supported the claim that the Capetians were of Carolingian lineage. That image accompanied Charles VIII into Italy in 1494, and the Italian Wars, Morrissey writes, "were started under the sign of Charlemagne".

Sixteenth-century humanists and jurists then stripped away the legends: Étienne Pasquier saw in the emperor's absolute power the seeds of the ruin of the Carolingian dynasty whereas François Hotman made his reign the golden age of a free Frankish general assembly which elected successive kings. When the House of Guise claimed Carolingian descent during the Wars of Religion, Charlemagne passed to the monarchy's opponents, and Henry IV preferred to be represented as Hercules.

Over the course of the following century, with the rise of the absolute monarchy, Charlemagne was called upon once more, to justify absolutist monarchy by reference to his conquests.

From the 1660s, even as absolute monarchs were presented as Hercules, Alexander, or Augustus, his image was soon called upon once more in order to support the claims of French territorial annexation by jurists; to be the subject of a feast day at the University of Paris; and to be invoked by court entertainments of the day – such as opera and ballet – as “the pure blood of Charlemagne” in the king and the Grand Condé's son.

In the eighteenth century, writers as different as Montesquieu and Mably, Malesherbes and the physiocrats, adapted the image to their own ends. He was even made a usurper by Voltaire. Yet the monarchy presented its own present as the highest point in history, there was no past golden age. The absolutist monarchy had largely abandoned historical justification of its legitimacy. But critics of all stripes opposed to absolutism continued to refer to his reign. Morrissey shows how the image was used by antiquarians of the eighteenth century to rehabilitate the old romances, and count de Caylus even located the origins of chivalry in the reign of the emperor. For some, he was the heroic just ruler who had returned the monarchy to its original principles. On the eve of the Revolution, Morrissey argues, there was agreement across these divisions "that everything should be as it had been in Charlemagne's time", and the image of a providential man who returned the nation to itself was preparing the ground on which Napoleon would build.

La Curne de Sainte-Palaye revived the study of the old romances, the count de Caylus traced all the romances of chivalry to Charlemagne's reign, and from 1775 the series Bibliothèque universelle des romans brought them to a wide readership. Malesherbes urged Louis XVI in 1775 to follow Charlemagne's example and hear the nation assembled, and the physiocrat Guillaume-François Le Trosne and the pamphleteers of 1788–1789 cited him in calling for assemblies of the nation. On the eve of the Revolution, Morrissey argues, opinion was deeply divided over what constitutional changes to make, yet there was agreement "that everything should be as it had been in Charlemagne's time". The consensus lasted into the early years of the Revolution: in 1790 speakers on both sides of the debate over the Civil Constitution of the Clergy invoked him. The image of a providential man who returned the nation to itself prepared the ground on which Napoleon would build.

Napoleon visited Aachen before his coronation, had the regalia known as the “honors of Charlemagne” used at coronation in Notre-Dame, and declared to his clergy "I am Charlemagne". Augustin Thierry and Jules Michelet later excluded the emperor from the history of the French nation, while François Guizot and Victor Hugo weighed the uses and dangers of great men through him. Philologists, from Claude Fauriel to Gaston Paris and Léon Gautier, who saw the newly printed Chanson de Roland as the national epic, turned Charlemagne from the creator of the nation into the nation's creation.

Morrissey goes on to describe how after the defeat of 1870, Charlemagne was seen to be too German, and his visibility transferred to the field of scholarly philology. A new political science also emerged which displaced all argument from national origins. A statue of Charlemagne, by Louis Rochet, equestrian, and known as Charlemagne et ses Leudes, had been produced for the Exposition Universelle of 1878 but found no buyer. Eventually, the Paris council agreed to place it in front of Notre-Dame only once a statue of Voltaire had been proposed; Morrissey calls its situation, half hidden by trees, an "absent presence". The author goes on to describe Charlemagne's adoption as a symbol of European unity in brief epilogue, and the book ends with the assertion that knowledge of past appropriations keeps history "at a distance sufficient to ward off blind adherence". The English edition corrects errors in the French original and has no bibliography.

== Critical reception ==
=== French edition ===
Cover of the original French edition by Gallimard (1997)

Philippe-Jean Catinchi, who reviewed the French edition for Le Monde, found the chapter on Charlemagne that Morrissey had written in 1992 for the collective history Les Lieux de mémoire "sometimes rather abrupt" and short of convincing examples. The book supplied the evidence. Texts carried the argument; the images were fewer but "perfectly deciphered". The twelfth centenary of the imperial coronation was three years off, and a European political identity might yet restore the emperor's standing: the book was "a rare lesson that does not forget the play is still being performed". The index was "incomplete and often confused" and the handling of events shaky: "is it really Frederick II who is defeated at Bouvines?" Catinchi called these "irritating details" that should not put readers off a "masterly contribution to the history of collective representations".

Janet L. Nelson, who reviewed the French edition for The Times Literary Supplement, found in it the French counterpart to Robert Folz's 1950 study of Charlemagne's legend in the medieval German empire, carried from the ninth century to the twentieth. The book "could hardly be more timely" for anyone watching Europe in 1997 "with mixed anxiety and hope". Morrissey gave his longest chapter, "perhaps most intriguing", to a treatise on palace government written in the 820s: ignored through the Middle Ages, reprinted by seventeenth-century editors, and by the eighteenth century a proof text for an "ancient" French constitutional monarchy. The tale of the emperor's statue, made under Napoleon III, spurned by the Third Republic and left half hidden by bushes outside Notre-Dame, was "cultural history at its most telling". Nelson called her two objections "niggles". Morrissey seemed to treat consensus and authority as incompatible, a "rather legalistic, and teleological" view that recent empirical research had contradicted. He had also neglected recent British historical work on myths that confer identity on peoples and kingdoms, by Rosamond McKitterick, Susan Reynolds, John Gillingham, Michael Clanchy and Robert Bartlett. Scholars on both sides of the Atlantic would read the book, she wrote, a wider audience needed an English translation, "and the sooner the better".

Christian Amalvi called the French edition "already a classic of the history of historiography" in his review for the Bibliothèque de l'École des chartes. It belonged beside two other books on national memory: Georges Duby's Le Dimanche de Bouvines (1973) and Gerd Krumeich's Jeanne d'Arc à travers l'histoire. Morrissey had written it directly in French, a "linguistic feat". Closer proofreading would have caught the slips. The Concordat of Bologna became "Boulogne" and, more seriously, Frederick II became the loser at Bouvines, where the defeated emperor was his rival Otto IV. Amalvi found two uses of Charlemagne between 1870 and 1914 underestimated. Léon Gautier and the scholars around the Revue des questions historiques invoked him constantly against the secularization of French society under Jules Ferry. French nationalists went on claiming him for the cause of revenge even after pan-Germanists had adopted him, as the immense success of Henri de Bornier's drama La Fille de Roland from 1875 to 1914 showed. These reservations "remain minor," wrote Amalvi.

More than a fifth of the French edition went to the eighteenth century, Revolution included, and Françoise Michaud-Fréjaville confined her short review for Dix-huitième Siècle to it. Morrissey set out the readings of Charlemagne that followed Baluze's edition of the capitularies. Some writers found in the Carolingian assemblies the rights of the great nobles, and Voltaire condemned a clerical conqueror; the reading with the most influence in the end, from Malesherbes and Moreau, held that a state could be reformed and keep its original character. Popular chapbooks, a humbler source, fixed the image of Charlemagne most people knew. Michaud-Fréjaville called the book documented and nuanced "while remaining lively". It had to be read whole, from Einhard at the start to the "admirable rehabilitation" of Victor Hugo's reflections in the lines he gave Charles V before the tomb at Aachen in Hernani (1830).

=== English edition ===
Jotham Parsons found in the English translation an argument, implicit but strong, that none of the great ruptures in French political history from Philip Augustus to Napoleon had been as total as often believed. The finding he ranked highest in his review belonged to the eighteenth century: the noble party lost its power struggle under the Regency, yet its Charlemagne went on developing and kept its influence. He called the book "an indispensable reference" for any mention of Charlemagne in a source from that span. The span also worked against it, he wrote: it was "often difficult to discern Morrissey's narrative thread", the argument "gets swamped in a thousand years of necessarily less than homogeneous history", Renaissance historicism was "somewhat underweight" and the art history "rather episodic and disconnected". He wanted more weight on the Church, since Charlemagne was invoked in every crisis between church and state at least from the Concordat of Bologna to Napoleon's. Parsons called Catherine Tihanyi's translation "perfectly serviceable" but with lapses: Pasquier's "our romances" became "our Romans", and Malesherbes, head of the royal censorship, became "director of the library". Half the plates were missing from his copy, and he wrote that readers with access to the French edition would "find it preferable to the translation".

In his review, Patrick J. Geary wrote that the book was "at once a history of French political ideology and a cautionary tale about the uses and abuses of the past". Each attempt to put Charlemagne to work for a present, he wrote, had been "constrained by the weight of competing traditions, individual intentions, and contemporary circumstances". He found in the book a "mastery of medieval and modern historiography and literature" and called Catherine Tihanyi's translation able. Geary found one weakness: Morrissey kept so closely to the French tradition that the German Karl der Große and the imperial Carolus Imperator showed "only intermittently", and the reader was unprepared when they returned in the Renaissance or under Napoleon. Charlemagne was by then being presented by some as the father of Europe, and Geary wrote that the study "eloquently shows the dangers of any such attempts to build the present on the ghost of a dead emperor".

The claim that Charlemagne cast an enormous shadow over French political culture was, Thomas E. Kaiser wrote in his review, "not likely to stir much controversy", yet it had "never received such systematic demonstration". He called the work "generally convincing" and the argument clearly expressed despite "occasional awkwardness in the translation". Kaiser found fault with the account of royalist historiography in the seventeenth and eighteenth centuries: Morrissey equated historical consciousness with admiration for Charlemagne, overstated how far the monarchy had given up on history, and underestimated royalist historians such as Jean-Baptiste Dubos, who credited Clovis with saving civilization, and Jacob-Nicolas Moreau. The Revolutionaries themselves used the royalist language of noble "tyranny" to justify cutting back feudal rights, he wrote, and a good case could be made that the modern French nation was established "as much through the denial of Charlemagne's legacy, as by its affirmation".

Donald R. Kelley called the book "an ambitiously hermeneutical project requiring vast scholarship as well as literary sensibility and historical judgment", carried out "with ingenuity and elegance". He wrote that Morrissey treated neither myth nor history as the only way into the past, and that he kept clear of both "the rather mechanical lieux de mémoire approach" of Pierre Nora's followers and the institutional survey Robert Folz had made of the German tradition. Kelley found the images joined in "a literary continuum largely of the author's making": Morrissey did not investigate that continuity but absorbed it into his own narrative. He preferred literary sources to historical ones, whereas Kelley wrote that "it was the historians who took command of this national image". Kelley called the book "more than rich and imaginative literary history", an interdisciplinary effort that did justice to a theme central to European culture over twelve centuries.
