= Charles Read (French historian) =

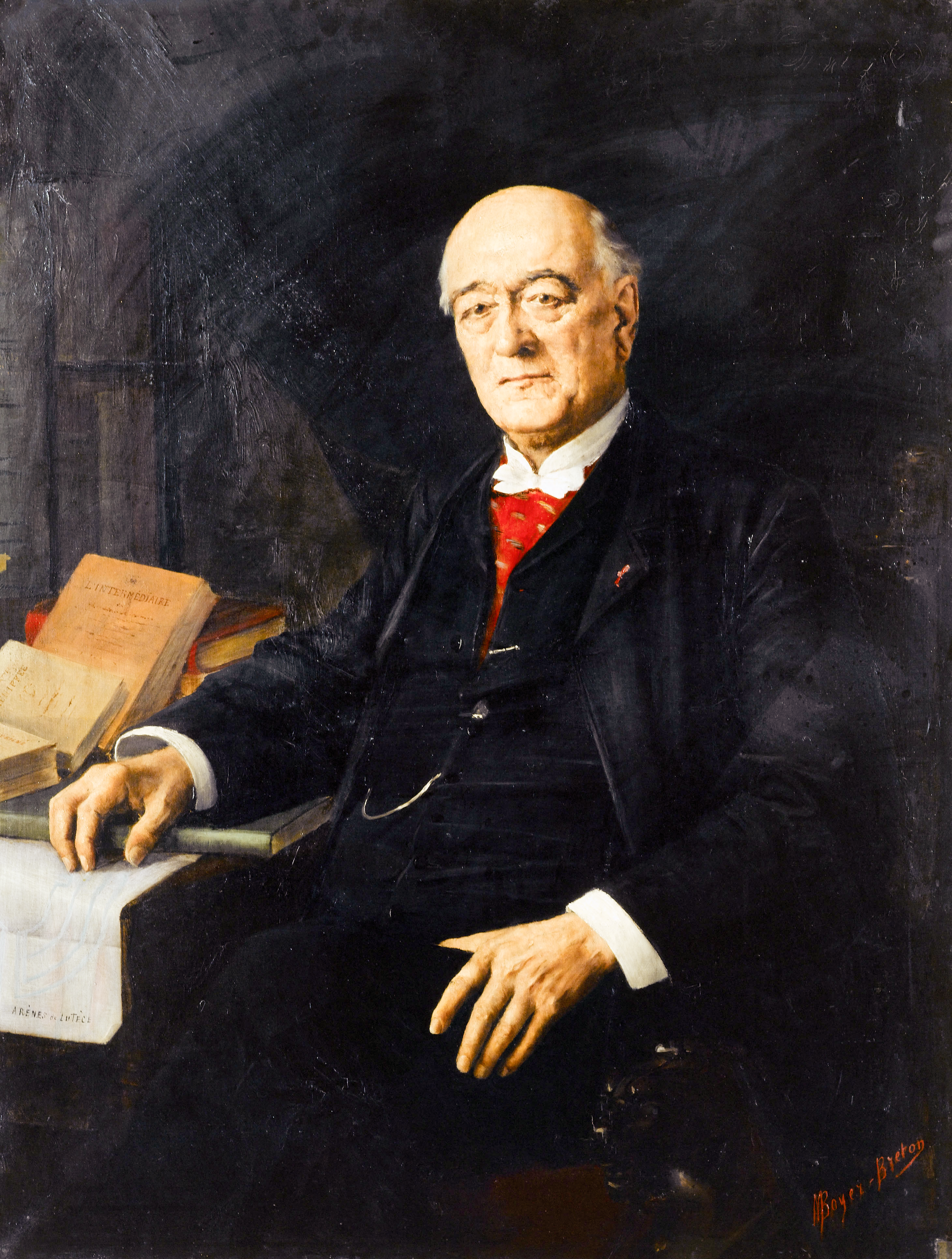
A c.1891 portrait of Read by Marthe Boyer-Breton.

Charles Read (22 January 1819 - 19 December 1898) was a French historian, specialising in 16th and early 17th century history and the history of Protestantism in France.

He was the founding president of the Société de l'histoire du protestantisme français in 1852, founded l'Intermédiaire des chercheurs et curieux and took a major part in the creation of what became the musée Carnavalet.

== Life ==
=== Early life ===
He was born in the 4th old arrondissement of Paris to Augustine Brulley and her Scottish husband William Read. He studied classics at the collège Louis-le-Grand then trained at the Faculté de droit de Paris. He was received as a lawyer, joined the bar in 1841, and two years later became a magistrate as a substitute for Montélimar. In 1845 he moved to be a substitute for Montargis. The French Provisional Government of 1848 made him sub-prefect of Blaye and Villeneuve-d’Agen and the following year he joined the Ministry for Education and Religions as head of the service for non-catholic faiths.

In that role he intervened in the reorganisation of French protestant churches and took a major part in the preparations for the 1852 decrees which replaced the consistories with presbyterial councils. 1852 also saw him found the Société de l'histoire du protestantisme français - a devout adherent of the Reformed faith himself, he edited the society's Bulletin historique et littéraire for fourteen years and managed its library at 54 rue des Saints-Pères. The Ministry's head Gustave Rouland accused him of favouring the Protestants over the State and so Read left that role in 1857 to become director of the litigation department for the Seine prefecture.

=== Archives and history ===
From 1867 to 1871 he was put in charge of the division for historical archive work. The fires in the Paris Commune of 1871 annihilated all the archive services which he headed, along with most of the documents and precious books in his own collection, and so he retired from public life to devote himself to history, poetry, archaeology, sciences and linguistics. The fires also triggered the foundation of the 'musée des Collections historiques' for documents on Parisian history, a foundation in which Read took a major role, and in the restoration of the hôtel Carnavalet to house the museum. He also helped save the arènes de Lutèce

He was a member of the Société nationale des Antiquaires de France He edited its Bulletin from 1852 to 1865 and for it collaborated on l'Histoire générale de Paris, France protestante, and Dictionnaires d'administration et de la politique. He also contributed articles to l’Intermédiaire des chercheurs et curieux, a magazine for which he had been founder-editor in 1864, using the pseudonym 'Carle de Rash', an anagram of his real name. He also published a large number of historical and literary works under his own name and under his pseudonym. For a few years he contributed to the Journal des débats. He also wrote under the pseudonyms 'A.-J. de Marnay' and 'C. R.' and translated several books from English.

=== Later life ===
He sided with Dreyfus during the Dreyfus Affair. He kept presenting himself as a candidate for the Académie française until some time before his death in the 5th arrondissement of Paris. He was buried on 11 December 1898 in the Montparnasse Cemetery at a very private funeral, with his widow Françoise Henriette Cordier joining him on 24 March 1902.

The couple had had two children, the poet, Henri-Charles Read, who died before he was twenty, and a daughter, who became executrix to Barbey d’Aurevilly, also inheriting that writer's papers. Read left interesting unpublished works and a library of rare books which entered the museum at the hotel Carnavalet.

== Publications ==
=== History ===
==== Author ====
- L'Amiral Coligny, 1853.
- Henri IV et le ministre Daniel Chamier, 1854.
- Bossuet dévoilé par un prêtre de son diocèse, 1864.
- Les 95 thèses de Luther contre les indulgences, 1870.
- Salomon de Brosse, architecte de Henri IV et de Marie de Médicis. Paris: Fischbacher. 1881. OCLC 921598180.

==== Editor ====
- 1564-1621, Daniel Chamier - journal de son voyage à la cour de Henri IV en 1607 et sa biographie. Paris: Société de l’histoire du protestantisme français. 1858. OCLC 6838120.
- Mémoires de Dumont de Bostagnet, with François Waddington, Paris, Michel Lévy frères, 1864.
- Agrippa d'Aubigné, Les Tragiques, 1872.
- Agrippa d'Aubigné, L'Enfer, 1873.
- Agrippa d'Aubigné, Le Printemps, 1874.
- "Le Tigre de 1560 - reproduit pour la première fois en fac-similé d'après l'unique exemplaire connu et publié avec des notes historiques, littéraires et bibliographiques". Paris: Académie des bibliophiles. 1875., (Note: Original work by François Hotman.)
- La Satyre Ménippée, 1876.
- Pierre-Ignace Jaunez-Sponville, Le Ruvarebohni, Paris : G. Fischbacher, 1881, 2 vol.

=== Other ===
- Note de statistique sur les cultes non catholiques reconnus en France, 1851.
- Vercingétorix, four-act lyric and dramatic poem, 1869.
