= Poitevin =

Poitevin may refer to:

- From or related to Poitou
- From or related to the town of Poitiers
- Poitevin dialect, the language spoken in the Poitou
- Poitevin horse, a breed of draught horse from Poitou, France
- Poitevine goat, a breed of goat from Western France
- Poitevin hound, a breed of hound

== People ==
- Alphonse Louis Poitevin (1819–1882), French chemist, photographer and civil engineer
- Guy Poitevin (1927–2008), French footballer and manager
- Maixent Poitevin, mayor of Poitiers from 1564 to 1566
- Roger the Poitevin (1060s-1130s), Anglo-Norman aristocrat
