= Jean Carbonnier =

French jurist (1908–2003)

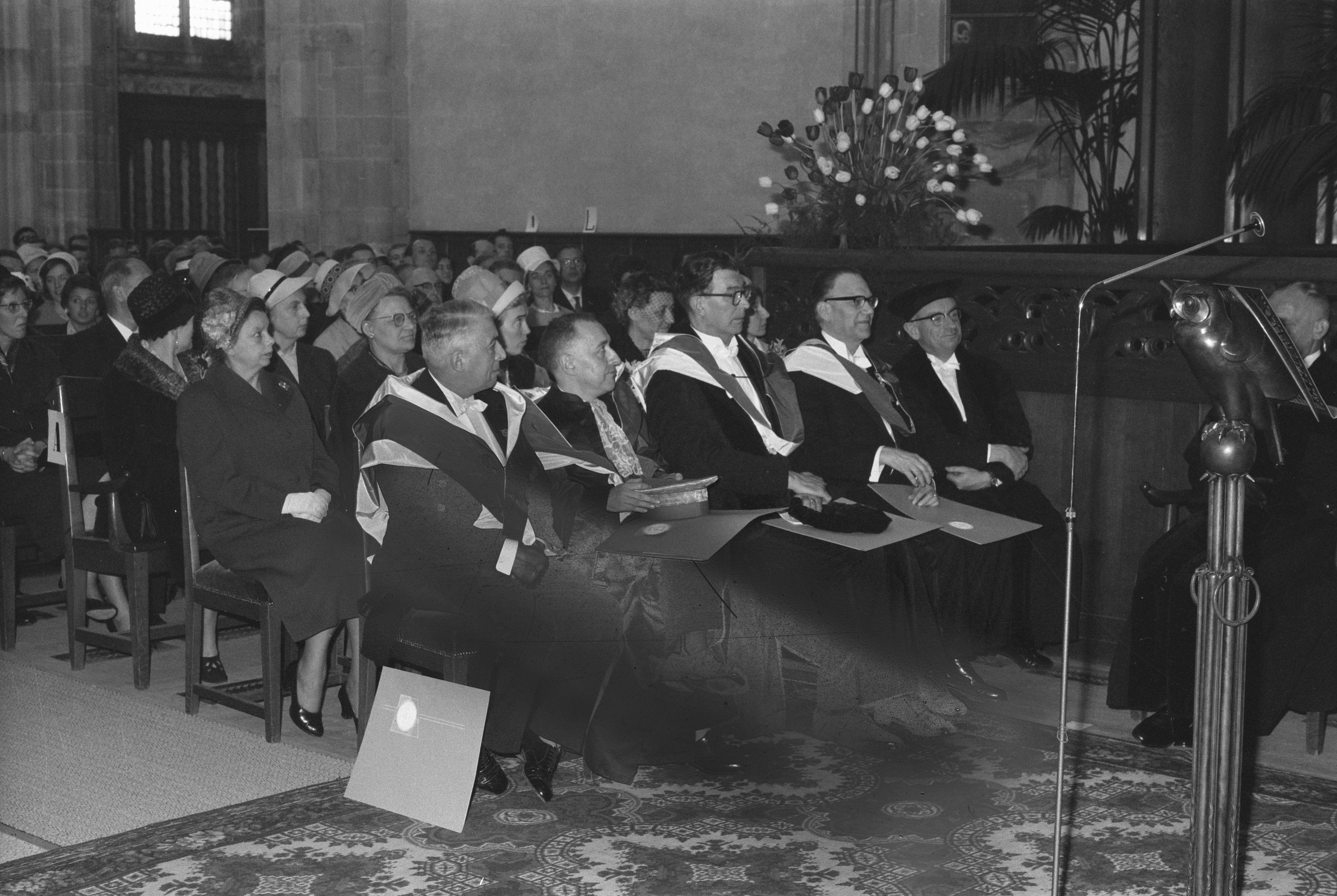
- André Parrot, Carbonnier, Hans Van Werveke and Gerard Knuvelder (Utrecht, 1961)
- Born: 20 April 1908; Libourne, France
- Died: 28 October 2003 (aged 95); Paris, France
- Occupation: Law professor

Jean Carbonnier (1908–2003) was one of the most important French jurists of the 20th century. He was a civil law specialist and a private law professor.

== Life and career ==
Jean Carbonnier was the son of Fernand Carbonnier and Dany Daniel. He married Madeleine Hugues.

His Protestant beliefs influenced his way of thinking and his work. Although Jean Carbonnier published theological and historical articles about Protestantism, he still supported secularity.

Jean Carbonnier studied at the Faculty of Law at the University of Bordeaux where he obtained his doctorate in 1932 and private law agrégation in 1937.

He was a professor at the Faculty of Law at the University of Poitiers from 1937 to 1955, teaching French civil law. He became dean in 1950. At this time, he published his Treatise on Civil Law (Droit civil) in 1955, which has been republished several times since then. Afterwards, Jean Carbonnier taught at the Paris Law Faculty (replaced with Panthéon-Assas University in 1970) until 1976.

Jean Carbonnier became President of L'Année Sociologique in 1964, and worked for the sociology journal during fifteen years. He also created and started heading the Laboratory for Legal Sociology (Laboratoire de sociologie juridique) at Panthéon-Assas University in 1968 - in order to produce data that would help law making.

On the international level, Jean Carbonnier supported the creation of the Research Committee on Sociology of Law and participated in the inauguration of the International Institute for the Sociology of Law in Oñati, with Renato Treves. Jean Carbonnier was particularly well known in Canada and Italy. As a professor, he also often referenced to foreign legal systems, such as Germany or Italy.

Apart from his academic career, Jean Carbonnier was also a writer: his book Les incertitudes du jeune Saxon. Une autofiction de Jean Carbonnier was published posthumously, in 2011. This fiction shows that Jean Carbonnier was not only a theorist, but also an author of literature. This element can be perceived while reading his theoretical works about law, since he always explained his thoughts with an elegant and precise way of writing. Les incertitudes du jeune Saxon represents at the same time a fiction (sort of Bildungsroman) and a reflection about law and history. This work is also linked with the story of his own family and tastes.

== Carbonnier's thought ==
Jean Carbonnier's vision of law was based on his own philosophy, which includes Protestantism, realism, skepticism, and empiricism – always with open-mindedness. He was at the same time a theorist, an author, and a lawmaker. That is why he was – and still is – often called "jurislateur," which can be translated as "jurislator" in English.

His works are open to the sociology of law and the philosophy of law, cleverly linking legal, political, and social sciences. The author observed society in order to understand it. He also considered legal phenomena as social facts. At the same time a jurist and a sociologist, Jean Carbonnier played an important role in adapting law to society's traditions and customs. He considered law as an artifact, and was interested in every system of norms. In Flexible droit, he explains how law is changeable, uncertain – and "flexible."

=== Law and Sociology ===
Jean Carbonnier inspired, constituted, and conceptualized the combination of the study of law with that of sociology (legal sociology) – at a time when it was not popular among French jurists. He practiced "sociology without rigor," as the subtitle of his work Flexible droit shows. Indeed, Jean Carbonnier did not like "rigid" law.

Since our society is multicultural, law must adapt to its transformations – for instance, concerning family. In Sociologie juridique (1968), Jean Carbonnier explained his theories about the links between law and society. This work represents his most famous one on the international level, especially thanks to the concepts he developed, as well as his account of the relationship between jurisprudence and social sciences. In Flexible droit (1969), the core study was "non-law" ("non-droit"), considered as the essence of social life. For Jean Carbonnier, when there is no law, other systems of social regulations will work instead – for instance, religion, morality, customs, friendships, or habits. This part of the book also made Jean Carbonnier an internationally recognized jurist. His last work, Droit et passion du droit sous la Vème République (1996), also is a legal and sociological work. His study of labor law and contract law represents a good example of legal sociology.

In sum, Jean Carbonnier established at the same time a clear and understandable sociological theory for jurists, as well as a legal theory within the reach of sociologists. This synthesis between law and sociology allowed the usage of sociological methods of investigation, thereby breaking with the "rational" tradition in French legislation. These methods include the opinion poll (IFOP, then INED) and field research in order to measure the "demand for law" expressed by citizens. This allowed notably the establishment of divorce by mutual consent (1975), at a time when divorce by fault was the only form offered to divorcing couples.

=== Civil Code and Family law ===
Jean Carbonnier renewed the French Civil Code, especially in the domain of Family Law. He wrote a major Treatise on Civil Law (Droit civil), which is not only a theoretical work, but also shows links with history, sociology, anthropology, and philosophy. The author defined the French Civil Code as the "Civil Constitution of French people," i.e. as part of the national, legal, and political culture in France.

Jean Carbonnier was regarded as an authority on family law and considered family as a legal area. He was the inspiration and wrote the pre-projects (avant-projets) for ambitious reforms, from 1964 to 1977. These reforms include fields such as incapacity law (1964 and 1968), parental authority (1970), filiation (1972), and divorce (1975). They were exposed and explained in Essais sur les lois (1979).

With Pierre Catala, a French law professor, Jean Carbonnier authored a proposition for the reform of inheritance law. It was taken up by the legislature in its law of 3 December 2001. French inheritance law was thereby adapted to the aspirations of the modern family.

=== Passion and Inflation of the Law ===
Through his critical mind and his convincing rhetoric, Jean Carbonnier used the term "passion" in the title of his book Droit et passion du droit sous la Vème République (1996). The idea behind it would be that producing too many laws tend to be harmful and dangerous. This refers to the tendency, in France, to legislate too much, leading to an "inflation" of the law. This excess is meant to limit arbitrary powers. Moreover, it is a consequence of decentralization and the importance of community law. Sociologically, with the growing power of the media, lawmakers must react constantly, which result in an increasing production of laws. For instance, some are used as tools for political and electoral communication. Law therefore becomes "educational" (pédagogique).

This passion is dangerous, or even destructive. Indeed, the more laws there are, the less likely it is possible to apply them effectively. In particular, inflation leads to misunderstanding or ignorance from citizens – and sometimes even from judges. This results in a lack of substance and credibility. The inflation therefore implies uncertainty (or insecurity). Jean Carbonnier's theories are still topical: for instance, in 2006, the French Council of State (Conseil d'Etat) criticized the excesses that could threaten social cohesion in its annual report about legal certainty (Sécurité juridique et complexité du droit).

=== Subjectivisation of the Law ===
Another evolution described by Jean Carbonnier is the subjectivisation of the law. This refers to the fact that the "rights to..." (droits à...) become more and more important. The author speaks in terms of a "pulverisation in subjective rights" (pulvérisation en droits subjectifs). Subjective rights (or entitlements) are replacing legal principles. This subjectivisation of the legal system reconstructs it, focusing on fundamental rights (substantial notion), instead of the law itself (institutional notion).

Therefore, law considers each individual (fundamental rights), rather than society as a whole. The legislation becomes more particular and precise. As a consequence, there is an inversion of the role and status of lawmakers in France: they are more and more concrete, whereas judges become more abstract. This results in individualization, which is a source of the inflation.

== Selected works ==
- Carbonnier, Jean (2002). Droit civil: Introduction (27th edition). Paris: Presses Universitaires de France, Collection Themis droit privé.
- Carbonnier, Jean (2004). Droit civil. Volume I (Introduction. Les personnes. La famille, l'enfant, le couple). Paris: Presses Universitaires de France, Collection Quadrige.
- Carbonnier, Jean (2004). Droit civil. Volume II (Les biens. Les obligations). Paris: Presses Universitaires de France, Collection Quadrige.
- Carbonnier, Jean (2006). Droit et passion du droit sous la Ve République (2nd edition). Paris: Flammarion, Collection Champs Essais.
- Carbonnier, Jean (2008). Écrits. Paris: Presses Universitaires de France.
- Carbonnier, Jean (1995). Essais sur les lois (2nd edition). Paris: Defrenois Ouvrages.
- Carbonnier, Jean (2001). Flexible droit – Pour une sociologie du droit sans rigueur (10th edition). Paris: L.G.D.J.
- Carbonnier, Jean (2011). Les incertitudes du jeune Saxon. Une autofiction de Jean Carbonnier. Paris: Lexis Nexis.
- Carbonnier, Jean (1978). Sociologie juridique (2nd edition). Paris: Presses Universitaires de France, Collection Quadrige.

== On Jean Carbonnier ==
- Arnaud, André-Jean; Andrini, Simona (1995). Jean Carbonnier, Renato Treves et la sociologie du droit. Paris: L.G.D.J.
- Beauchard, Jean; Bénabent, Alain; Catala, Pierre (2007). Hommage à Jean Carbonnier. Paris: Dalloz-Sirey.
- Frison-Roche, Marie-Anne (2003). "Jean Carbonnier (1908-2003)". L'Année sociologique, Volume 53.
- Nisio, Francesco Saverio, Jean Carbonnier : regards sur le droit et le non-droit, Paris, Dalloz, 2005, XII-201 p. (ISBN 978-2-247-06170-9)
- Verdier, Raymond (2008). "À l'occasion du centenaire de la naissance de Jean Carbonnier". Droit et cultures, Volume 56.
- Verdier, Raymond (2012). Jean Carbonnier : L'homme et l'œuvre. Paris: Presses Universitaires de Paris Ouest. ISBN 9782821851139, 9782840160830

== See also ==
- Sociology of Law
