= Jacques Poujol =

French essayist and historian of Protestantism

Jacques Poujol (12 February 1922 - 18 February 2012) was a French essayist and historian of Protestantism. He also fought in the French Resistance during the Second World War.

== Biography ==
He was born in Toulon to Pierre Poujol, a classics teacher in several lycées in the French provinces and Paris as well as one of the leaders of the Christian social movement and author of publications on the Protestant Cévennes. Jacques' mother Marie Teissier de Caladon was descended from a Vebronnaise family. His three younger siblings were the prefect and historian Robert Poujol, sociologist Geneviève Poujol and Denise Poujol. He was also brother-in-law to Michel Rocard.

Jacques Poujol studied at the lycée Henri-IV in 1934-1942 and graduated in classics from the La Sorbonne in 1943, but then refused to do national service and instead in June 1943 joined the maquis in La Soureilhade (which on 12 July 1944 became the maquis Aigoual-Cévennes. He remained with them until September 1944 and from January to August 1945 served in the 1e RMSM of the 2nd Armored Division under general Leclerc. In 1948 he began teaching French literature at the University of California in Los Angeles and in 1955 at the faculté des lettres de Paris he successfully defended his doctoral thesis on the evolution and influence of absolutism in France between 1498 and 1559.

He then became a cultural advisor in New York from 1961 to 1966 then counsellor to France's Office national des universités et écoles françaises back in Paris until 1978. He then pursued a professorial career at the Centre international d'études pédagogiques in Sèvres until 1983, the same year as he was made secretary general of the Société de l'histoire du protestantisme français, a role he held for five years. He died in 2012 in the 15th arrondissement of Paris.

== Publications ==
- Édition critique de la Monarchie de France par Claude de Seyssel, Librairie de France, 1961.
- Initiation à la civilisation américaine, (with Michel Oriano), Masson, paris, 1969.
- Cévennes, Terre de refuge, with Philippe Joutard and Patrick Cabanel, Presses du Languedoc-Club Cévenol, 1987.
- (éd.) Journal de route en Cévennes par Robert-Louis Stevenson, with Gordon Golding (translator), Philippe Joutard et J. Blondel. Éditions Privat-Club Cévenol, 1991.
- La France protestante, Histoire et lieux de mémoire, (with H. Dubief, Max Chaleil éditeur, 1992, p. 454 ISBN 978-2846210669.
- (dir.) Les Protestants français pendant la Seconde Guerre mondiale, with André Encrevé), Paris, numéro spécial du Bulletin de la Société de l'histoire du protestantisme français, 1994.
- Protestants dans la France en guerre, 1939-1945, dictionnaire thématique et biographique, Éditions de Paris-Max Chaleil, 2000.
- Itinéraires : Des chrétiens témoignent (2000) with Simone Pacot, Jean Boissonnat et Frédéric de Coninck, éd. Empreinte Temps Présent

== Honours and distinctions ==
- Vice-president of the Club cévenol
- Secretary general of the Société de l'histoire du protestantisme français
- Member of the Académie des Hauts Cantons (seat II)

== Bibliography ==
- (in French) Patrick Cabanel, « Jacques Poujol (1922-2012) », Bulletin de la Société de l'histoire du protestantisme français, vol. 158, no 3, July-September 2012, p. 649-650
- (in French) « L'esprit des camisards: Jacques et Robert Poujol dans le maquis cévenol », in Dominique Missika & Dominique Veillon, Résistance: Histoire de familles 1940-1945, Armand Colin, 2009 (ISBN 2200350457), p. 118-125.
