= Robert Morrissey =

American scholar of French literature

- Born: Robert John Morrissey; September 7, 1947 (age 79); Boston, Massachusetts, U.S.
- Citizenship: American
- Known for: Founding and directing the ARTFL Project
- Title: Benjamin Franklin Professor Emeritus of French Literature
- Awards: Chevalier of the Legion of Honour (2013); Chevalier of the Ordre national du Mérite (1997); Grand Prix d'histoire Chateaubriand (1997); Chevalier of the Ordre des Palmes académiques (1990)

Academic background
- Education: University of Chicago (PhD, 1982); Paris-Sorbonne University (MA, 1971); University of Massachusetts Amherst (BA, 1970)

Academic work
- Discipline: French literature
- Sub-discipline: Eighteenth- and nineteenth-century French literature, history, and culture
- Institutions: University of Chicago; University of Chicago Center in Paris; International Institute of Research in Paris
- Main interests: French cultural and intellectual history Charlemagne in French mythology The idea of glory Digital humanities and lexicography
- Notable works: Charlemagne and France (2003); The Economy of Glory (2014); ARTFL edition of the Encyclopédie
- Notable ideas: Glory as accumulated symbolic capital
- Website: ARTFL Project

Robert John Morrissey (born September 7, 1947) is an American scholar of French literature who taught at the University of Chicago from 1981 to 2026 and is Benjamin Franklin Professor Emeritus there. His work deals with eighteenth- and nineteenth-century French literature, history, and culture. Two of his books have been translated into English: Charlemagne and France (2003), on Charlemagne in French mythology, and The Economy of Glory (2014), on the idea of glory from the Ancien Régime to the fall of Napoleon. He is the founder and director of the ARTFL Project, a database of French-language texts. He was made a Chevalier of the Legion of Honour in 2013.

== Early life and education ==
Morrissey was born in Boston on September 7, 1947. He took a bachelor's degree in economics from the University of Massachusetts Amherst in 1970 and a master's degree from the Cours de Civilisation Française at the Université de Paris-Sorbonne in 1971. He also studied at the Université de Genève and the Università per Stranieri in Perugia. He completed his PhD in French literature at the University of Chicago in 1982, with honors.

== Career ==
Morrissey began teaching at the University of Chicago in 1981 and held the Benjamin Franklin Professorship in the Department of Romance Languages and Literatures until his retirement in 2026. He has served as executive director of the France Chicago Center and as a senior fellow in the university's Computation Institute. He was the inaugural director of the University of Chicago Center in Paris, which opened in 2003, and led it until 2006; in 2023 he became executive director of the university's International Institute of Research in Paris. His teaching covered eighteenth- and nineteenth-century French literature, with courses on Montesquieu, Rousseau, Diderot, Chateaubriand, Stendhal, and Hugo.

Morrissey founded the ARTFL Project (American and French Research on the Treasury of the French Language) and directs it. A digital humanities collaboration with the French National Center for Scientific Research (CNRS) based at the University of Chicago. The original CNRS database has been augmented over time and ARTFL’s French current holdings include some 25 French databases ranging from the Renaissance through the French Revolution and on to the 19th and 20th centuries. The databases are catalogued by the Library of Congress. He is general editor of the ARTFL edition of Diderot and d'Alembert's Encyclopédie, first published online in 1998.

== Work ==
L'Empereur à la barbe fleurie: Charlemagne dans la mythologie et l'histoire de France was published by Gallimard in 1997. Catherine Tihanyi's English translation, Charlemagne and France: A Thousand Years of Mythology, appeared from the University of Notre Dame Press in 2003 in the Laura Shannon Series in French Medieval Studies. The book traces Charlemagne's place in the French imagination from his death to the end of the nineteenth century, drawing on literary history, art history, political ideology, and the history of scholarship. It follows the emperor through the chansons de geste and the Renaissance, and shows how from the seventeenth century onward he became a vehicle for ideas of the French nation and its monarchy.

Napoléon et l'héritage de la gloire appeared from the Presses Universitaires de France in 2010, and Teresa Lavender Fagan's English translation, The Economy of Glory: From Ancien Régime France to the Fall of Napoleon, from the University of Chicago Press in 2014. Morrissey argues that the Napoleonic regime encouraged the French to reconnect with their past and offered glory as a founding value that would close the breach opened by the Revolution. He defines glory as a form of accumulated "symbolic capital" and pursues the concept from antiquity through the quarrel of the Ancients and the Moderns, Louis XIV, and the Enlightenment to Napoleon. Later chapters take up the literary afterlife of glory in Madame de Staël and Chateaubriand, with a chapter on the Mémorial de Sainte-Hélène.

His other books include La Rêverie jusqu'à Rousseau: Recherches sur un topos littéraire (1984) and a critical edition of Rousseau's Rêveries du promeneur solitaire (2004). With Sylvain Menant he edited Héroïsme et Lumières (Honoré Champion, 2010).

=== Reception ===
Originally published in French under the title of The Emperor with the Flowing Beard (L’Empereur à la barbe fleurie) Morrissey’s work on Charlemagne was awarded the Grand Prix Chateaubriand in history. In her review of the book for the Times Literary Supplement, Janet Nelson described it as “an ambitious consistently thought-provoking book. […] Exploring successive French constructions and deconstructions of the Charlemagne myth, Morrissey […] casts a penetrating gaze on self-images that are French, and past, but also have important implications for Europe’s present and future.” Upon its translation into English, Jotham Parsons of Duquesne University also described Charlemagne and France as a "very ambitious study" and predicted it would be "an indispensable reference for scholars attempting to understand any literary or historical reference to Charlemagne in any source from that long period". But, he also thought its very range at times a problem: "it is often difficult to discern Morrissey's narrative thread, and his argument gets swamped in a thousand years of necessarily less than homogeneous history". He would have liked Charlemagne's relation to the Church to receive more attention. The French study was also reviewed in such leading French periodicals such as Le Monde and the Nouvel Observateur. The English translation was also reviewed by Patrick J. Geary in The American Historical Review, and in The Journal of Modern History.

Doina Pasca Harsanyi of Central Michigan University reviewed The Economy of Glory for H-France Review. She described the book as "a gift, an erudite though never pedantic journey through the French past" and its reflections "elegant and deeply thought out", but judged that, at times, the analysis "lacks sufficient depth", objecting that "texts belonging to sycophants are given too much unquestioned authority" and that the book moves too quickly from one topic to the next. In their review in The Modern Language Review, Linda and Marsha Frey state that “specialists will appreciate this illumination of the Napoleonic moment and will debate the role of glory in fusing pre- and post-Revolutionary France” while noting that “this book is not for the uninitiated.” Melanie Conroy in Nineteenth-Century French Studies characterizes the work as a “necessary read for French scholars, particularly for specialists of the eighteenth and nineteenth centuries and highlights the importance of the concepts of the “economy of glory” and the “aesthetics of fusion.” She finds the last conclusion brief and dense, and suggests that it should be “studied and extended, perhaps by other authors.”

== Selected publications ==
=== Books ===
- Morrissey, Robert. La Rêverie jusqu'à Rousseau: Recherches sur un topos littéraire. Lexington, KY: French Forum, 1984.
- Morrissey, Robert. L'Empereur à la barbe fleurie: Charlemagne dans la mythologie et l'histoire de France. Bibliothèque des histoires. Paris: Gallimard, 1997. Translated by Catherine Tihanyi as Charlemagne and France: A Thousand Years of Mythology. Notre Dame, IN: University of Notre Dame Press, 2003.
- Morrissey, Robert. Napoléon et l'héritage de la gloire. Paris: Presses Universitaires de France, 2010. Translated by Teresa Lavender Fagan as The Economy of Glory: From Ancien Régime France to the Fall of Napoleon. Chicago: University of Chicago Press, 2014.
- Morrissey, Robert, and Philippe Roger, eds. L'Encyclopédie: du réseau au livre et du livre au réseau. Paris: Honoré Champion, 2001.
- Morrissey, Robert, and Sylvain Menant, eds. Héroïsme et Lumières. Paris: Honoré Champion, 2010.

=== Editions ===
- Diderot, Denis, and Jean le Rond d'Alembert. Encyclopédie ou Dictionnaire raisonné des sciences, des arts et des métiers. Edited by Robert Morrissey. Electronic edition. Chicago: ARTFL, 1998. Corrected and augmented edition, including the four-volume Supplément, 2004; third edition, 2009.
- Rousseau, Jean-Jacques. Les Rêveries d'un promeneur solitaire, suivies des Lettres à Malesherbes et d'un choix de textes sur la rêverie. Edited by Robert Morrissey. Fasano and Paris: Schena and Presses de l'Université de Paris-Sorbonne, 2004.
- Bayle, Pierre. Dictionnaire historique et critique. 5th ed. (1740). Edited by Robert Morrissey. Electronic edition. Chicago: ARTFL, 2005.

=== Edited volumes and special issues ===
- Morrissey, Robert, ed. Textual Paraphernalia. Special issue, SubStance, no. 56 (1988).
- Morrissey, Robert, ed. Charlemagne, figure de l'Europe. Special issue, Notes de la Fondation Saint-Simon (June 1997).
- Morrissey, Robert, ed. Cahiers Parisiens / Parisian Notebooks. Nos. 1–3. Paris: University of Chicago Center in Paris, 2005–6.

=== Articles and book chapters ===
- Morrissey, Robert. "Vers un topos littéraire: la préhistoire de la rêverie." Modern Philology 77, no. 3 (February 1980): 261–90.
- Morrissey, Robert. "La Rêverie et les limites de la raison." Saggi e ricerche di letteratura francese 20 (1981): 73–91.
- Morrissey, Robert. "A Large Natural Language Data Base: American and French Research on the Treasury of the French Language." With Claude Del Vigna. Educom 18, no. 1 (Spring 1983): 10–13.
- Morrissey, Robert. "La Pratique du théâtre et le langage d'illusion." XVIIe siècle (March 1984): 17–27.
- Morrissey, Robert. "La représentation de Charlemagne et le discours des origines nationales au XIXe siècle." Cahiers de l'Institut de Sociologie et de Science Politique, no. 7. Neuchâtel, 1986: 31–58.
- Morrissey, Robert. "Rêverie et roman chez Flaubert." French Forum 13, no. 1 (January 1988): 31–45.
- Morrissey, Robert. "Breaking In (Flaubert in Parentheses)." SubStance, no. 56 (1988): 49–62.
- Morrissey, Robert. "Starobinski and Otherness." Introduction to Jean Starobinski, Transparency and Obstruction, translated by Arthur Goldhammer, xi–xxxvi. Chicago: University of Chicago Press, 1988.
- Morrissey, Robert. "Closing Out Charlemagne: The Representation of History and the Discourse of National Origins in Nineteenth-Century France." Sociocriticism 3, no. 2: 95–129.
- Morrissey, Robert. "Statistical Guides for Literary Analysis: A Test." Linguistica Computazionale 6 (1991): 65–80.
- Morrissey, Robert. "Charlemagne." In Les Lieux de mémoire: Les France, edited by Pierre Nora, 3:630–73. Paris: Gallimard, 1992. Translated in Rethinking France: Les Lieux de mémoire, vol. 1, The State, 133–81. Chicago: University of Chicago Press, 2001.
- Morrissey, Robert. "Le Gaulois errant d'Eugène Sue." In La politique du texte, 77–94. Lille: Presses Universitaires de Lille, 1992.
- Morrissey, Robert. "Whose House Is This: Feeling at Home in Post-Revolutionary France." In Home and Its Dislocations in Nineteenth-Century France, edited by Suzanne Nash, 125–46. Albany: SUNY Press, 1993.
- Morrissey, Robert. "Texts and Contexts: The ARTFL Database in French Studies." Profession (1993): 27–34.
- Morrissey, Robert. "Sociabilité et Lumières: la passion de l'échange." Critique (January 1997): 78–88.
- Morrissey, Robert. "L'antiquité de la modernité: Charlemagne dans la Bibliothèque universelle des romans." In L'Esprit des lieux: le patrimoine et la cité, edited by Daniel Grange and Dominique Poulot, 331–42. Grenoble: Presses Universitaires de Grenoble, 1997.
- Morrissey, Robert. "Du livre au réseau: l'Encyclopédie de Diderot sur l'Internet." With John Iverson and Mark Olsen. Recherches sur Diderot et sur l'Encyclopédie, no. 25 (October 1998): 163–68.
- Morrissey, Robert. "Charlemagne à l'âge des Lumières." Mémoires du passé germanique, nos. 55–56 (2000): 57–68.
- Morrissey, Robert. "Charlemagne in the Encyclopédie." In Philologies Old and New: Essays in Honor of Peter Dembowski, edited by Joan Grimbert and Carol Chase, 159–77. Princeton, NJ: Edward C. Armstrong Monographs, 2001.
- Morrissey, Robert. "The Encyclopédie: Monument for a Nation." In Ways of Knowing, Ways of Reading: Using the Encyclopédie, edited by Daniel Brewer and Julie Hayes, 143–61. Studies on Voltaire and the Eighteenth Century. 2002.
- Morrissey, Robert. "Charlemagne et la légende impériale." In L'Empire des muses: Napoléon, les arts et les lettres, edited by Jean-Claude Bonnet, 331–47. Paris: Belin, 2004.
- Morrissey, Robert. "The Mémorial de Sainte-Hélène and the Poetics of Fusion." MLN 120 (2005): 716–32.
- Morrissey, Robert. "L'Empereur, le poète et la mythistoire de Charlemagne." In Hugo et l'histoire, edited by Léon-François Hoffmann and Suzanne Nash, 37–56. Paris: Schena and Presses de l'Université de Paris-Sorbonne, 2005.
- Morrissey, Robert. "L'Effet Napoléon." Critique, no. 760 (March 2006): 196–207.
- Morrissey, Robert. "Mining Eighteenth-Century Ontologies: Machine Learning and Knowledge Classification in the Encyclopédie." Digital Humanities Quarterly 3, no. 2 (Spring 2009).
- Morrissey, Robert. "Plundering Philosophers: Identifying Sources of the Encyclopédie." With Timothy Allen, Stéphane Douard, Charles M. Cooney, Russell Horton, Mark Olsen, and Robert Voyer. Journal of the Association for History and Computing (2009).
- Morrissey, Robert. "Re-imagining French Lexicography: The Dictionnaire vivant de la langue française." With Timothy Allen. Dictionaries: Journal of the Dictionary Society of North America 32 (2011): 129–43.
- Morrissey, Robert. "Chateaubriand entre le 'démon de la publicité' et le démon de son cœur." Critique (March 2013): 254–67.
- Morrissey, Robert. "To Quote or Not to Quote: Citation Strategies in the Encyclopédie." With Dan Edelstein and Glenn Roe. Journal of the History of Ideas 74, no. 2 (April 2013): 213–36.
- Morrissey, Robert. "Stendhal: Julien Sorel in the Footsteps of Napoleon." In Exemplarity and Singularity: Thinking through Particulars in Philosophy, Literature, and Law, edited by Michèle Lowrie and Susanne Lüdemann, 181–91. New York: Routledge, 2015.
- Morrissey, Robert. "L'Économie de la gloire." In Diplomaties au temps de Napoléon, 275–87. Paris: CNRS Éditions, 2015.
- Morrissey, Robert. "Discourses and Disciplines in the Enlightenment: Topic Modeling the French Encyclopédie." With Glenn Roe and Clovis Gladstone. Frontiers in Digital Humanities (January 12, 2016).
- Morrissey, Robert. "La Littérature à l'âge des algorithmes." With Glenn Roe and Clovis Gladstone. Revue d'histoire littéraire de la France 116, no. 3 (July–September 2016): 595–617.
- Morrissey, Robert. "800: Le Couronnement de Charlemagne." In L'Histoire de France vue d'ailleurs, edited by Jean-Noël Jeanneney and Jeanne Gérout, 56–67. Paris: Les Arènes, 2016.
- Morrissey, Robert. "Pour une esthétique herméneutique: du Dictionnaire historique et critique de Bayle à l'Encyclopédie." With Glenn Roe. TRANEL, no. 69 (Winter 2018): 5–22.
- Morrissey, Robert. "The ARTFL Encyclopédie: Towards a Hermeneutical Aesthetic." With Glenn Roe. In Digitizing Enlightenment: Digital Humanities and the Transformation of Eighteenth-Century Studies, edited by Simon Burrows and Glenn Roe, 27–54. Oxford University Studies in the Enlightenment, 2020.
- Morrissey, Robert. "Du devoir de tout lire au pouvoir de la lecture à grande échelle." With Glenn Roe. In Observations de la vie littéraire: humanités numériques et études littéraires, edited by Didier Alexandre, 79–102. Paris: Classiques Garnier, 2022.
- Morrissey, Robert. "Hidden in Plain Sight: The Questions sur l'Encyclopédie in the Nineteenth Century." With Glenn Roe. In L'Écriture est la peinture de la voix: Essays in Honour of Nicholas Cronk, edited by Gillian Pink and Thomas Wynn. Liverpool: Liverpool University Press, 2024.
- Morrissey, Robert. "Lumières et discours victimaire: penser le pire." In Le Pouvoir en procès: opinion publique et légitimité politique des Lumières au Premier Empire, edited by Ryan Brown and Maximilien Novak, 39–53. Paris: Classiques Garnier, 2024.

== Awards and honors ==
- Chevalier of the Ordre des Palmes académiques, 1990
- Chevalier of the Ordre national du Mérite, 1997
- Grand Prix d'histoire Chateaubriand, 1997, for L'Empereur à la barbe fleurie
- Chevalier of the Legion of Honour, conferred in September 2013; French Minister of Foreign Affairs Laurent Fabius presented the decoration at a ceremony at the University of Chicago on May 11, 2014
