= The Economy of Glory =

2014 book by Robert Morrissey

- Cover of the English edition (University of Chicago Press, 2014)
- Author: Robert Morrissey
- Original title: Napoléon et l'héritage de la gloire
- Translator: Teresa Lavender Fagan
- Language: English
- Subject: Napoleon, the concept of glory, and French cultural history
- Genre: Intellectual history
- Publisher: University of Chicago Press
- Publication date: 2014
- Publication place: United States
- Media type: Print (hardcover), e-book
- Pages: 272
- ISBN: 978-0-226-92458-8
- Dewey Decimal: 944.05
- LC Class: DC203.9.M6813 2014

The Economy of Glory: From Ancien Régime France to the Fall of Napoleon is a 2014 book by Robert Morrissey, an American scholar and the Benjamin Franklin Professor of French Literature at the University of Chicago.

Translated by Teresa Lavender Fagan from the French Napoléon et l'héritage de la gloire (Presses universitaires de France, 2010), it is a study in intellectual and cultural history that traces the idea of glory (gloire) in France from classical antiquity and Christian thought through the Enlightenment to the Napoleonic era. Morrissey argues that Napoleon Bonaparte made glory the basis of a "politics of fusion" intended to overcome the rupture of the French Revolution, and follows this "economy of glory" from the institutions of the Consulate and Empire to the Mémorial de Sainte-Hélène and the "Napoleon effect" in nineteenth-century French literature.

Cover of the original French edition Napoléon et l'héritage de la gloire (Presses universitaires de France, 2010)

== Synopsis ==
Morrissey states at the outset that he is writing neither a biography of Napoleon nor a survey of his image. His subject is what he calls "the Napoleon effect" (how the figure of Napoleon functions within French culture) and an "economy of glory," a system in which glory operates as moral currency: accumulated and exchanged like wealth, it buys distinction and binds individual ambition to the common good. Napoleon, in this account, turned that inheritance into a politics of fusion meant to reconcile pre- and post-Revolutionary France.

The first half of the book reconstructs a genealogy of the idea. Morrissey identifies two recurring tensions: between the singular hero and the community, and between glory as public opinion and as inner moral worth. After the warrior renown of Homer's Achilles and the magnanimous man of Aristotle, Cicero attempts to define a glory that is republican rather than purely military. Christian thought reworks the idea: Ambrose, Augustine, and Thomas Aquinas tie glory to a transcendent truth.

As the French monarchy grows ever more assertive, the theme runs through the Chanson de Roland, Charlemagne and the crusading ideal, Montaigne, and the heroic drama of Corneille to the cult of incomparable royal glory under Louis XIV. Fénelon and other critics of absolutism counter that cult with an ideal of disinterested "pure love." In Morrissey's telling, the eighteenth century does not demolish the hero. Montesquieu makes honor the principle of monarchy, while Marat, d'Holbach, Marmontel, Guibert, and Sieyès theorize glory as a "secular marvelous" and a self-regulating mechanism of emulation, distinct from the commercial model of self-interest worked out by Mandeville, Boisguilbert, and Adam Smith.

In the remaining chapters, Morrissey reads the speeches and poems surrounding the victory at Marengo and the transfer of Turenne's remains to the Temple de Mars as the point at which glory began to legitimate the new regime. The Legion of Honor and the nobility of the Empire follow as institutions designed to extend that economy from the army to civil society. He presents the Napoleonic moment as "the final battle in the long quarrel between the Ancients and the Moderns," in which a revolutionized France projected itself into myth to return to history. A chapter on the Mémorial de Sainte-Hélène treats Las Cases's work as a "poetics of fusion," an amalgam of epic and intimate registers that casts glory onto the banality of exile and stages a "struggle to the death for recognition."

The Napoleon effect plays out in nineteenth-century literature and thought: Stendhal, Balzac, Chateaubriand, Victor Hugo, Victor Cousin, and Renan. The political economy of glory, he argues, collapsed in 1815 but survived as a literary and national ideal.

== Critical reception ==
Alex Grab called the book "original," "erudite," and grounded in English and French sources. He summarized its argument: Napoleon democratized an aristocratic ideal and used it to fuse pre- and post-Revolutionary France. His main reservation was that, since "the concepts of glory and heroism are not new topics in the Napoleonic historiography," the book might have opened by engaging that literature. The criticism was minor, he stressed, and the book "an indispensable read for anybody interested in French cultural history and the significance of glory in Ancien Régime France."

For Jeremy Black, the book was "an interesting piece of work," though one "within the constraints of an approach that reflects the tendency of French scholarship to look to an exceptionalist account." He regretted that the English version made "no attempt ... to adapt or extend the volume," for instance by comparing Napoleon with George Washington as a soldier turned unifying national figure. The silence on Napoleon III struck him as a missed chance to assess the legacy; "the treatment is somewhat instrumentalist, and the extent of dissent within Napoleonic France is underplayed." He credited the analysis of how Napoleon adapted and repositioned traditions of gloire.

Doina Pasca Harsanyi welcomed the book as "a gift," likened reading it to joining "a sparkling, learned conversation," and praised its "subtle readings of judiciously chosen literary texts." But the eighteenth-century chapters could read "like an unnecessarily rushed gallop through one exciting topic after another," she wrote, and texts by court flatterers were "given too much unquestioned authority." She added that her criticisms "in no way detract from the value of the work." Most rewarding were the discussion of the Napoleonic political vision and the analysis of the Mémorial de Sainte-Hélène.

Where many studies of so controversial a figure end up evaluating Napoleon himself, Melanie Conroy observed, Morrissey took "a largely neutral stance," examining how the emperor established his regime by organizing glory, "the currency of his empire." She rated the book "a fundamental addition to the scholarship on the Consulate and the First French Empire" and recommended it to scholars in French studies, particularly specialists in the eighteenth and nineteenth centuries. Teresa Lavender Fagan's translation was "readable and elegant." In the conclusion on nineteenth-century literature she saw "the most suggestive, but also least developed, part of the book," a brief, dense section that "deserves to be studied and extended, perhaps by other researchers." She predicted that the economy of glory and the "aesthetics of fusion" would prove central to the study of the century's literature.

The study's originality, Antoine Lilti argued, lay in looking upstream at the genealogy of the politics of glory rather than at the familiar Napoleonic legend. He singled out the book's demonstration that the Enlightenment, far from rejecting glory, worked to redefine it and restore its moral effectiveness as a counter to the commercial model and the morality of private interest. He commended the chapter on the Mémorial.

Napoleon, Michel Arrous wrote, needed to produce glory to eclipse that of others, while the imperative to erase the old nobility from memory "undermines the will to put in place a political economy of glory," a "double paradox" in Arrous's phrase. He retraced the argument through the Marengo moment, Garat's eulogy of Desaix and Kléber, the debates over the Legion of Honor, and the recourse to a mythologized Charlemagne. Particular praise went to the pages on Chateaubriand, on Les Misérables as an epic of obscure heroism, and on Stendhal, whose Le Rouge et le Noir Morrissey reads as "a long illustration of the disastrous effects of the projection of glory onto the everyday."
