= Hesbécourt =

- Commune
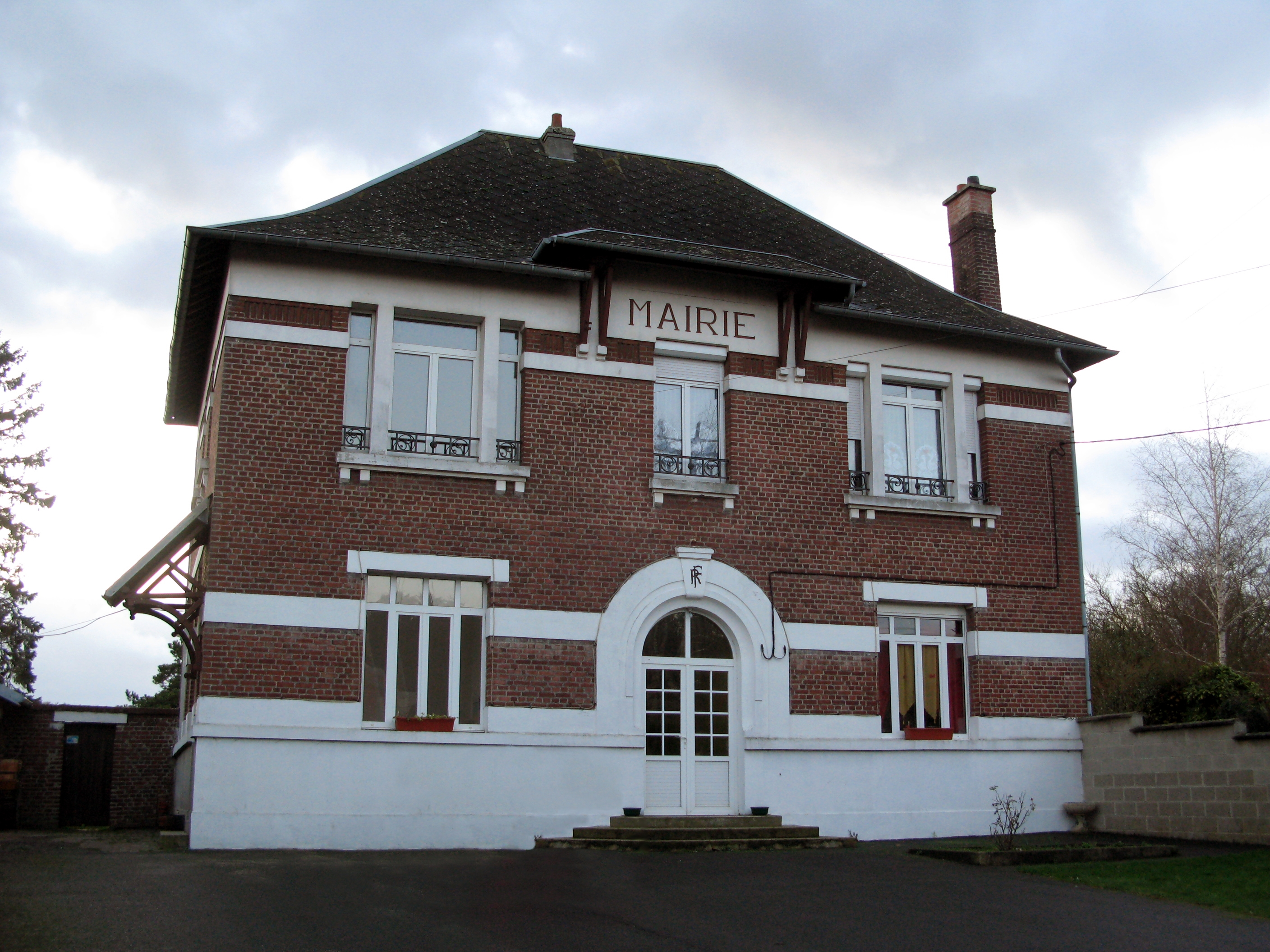
- The town hall in Hesbécourt
- Location of Hesbécourt
- Location within France Location within Hauts-de-France
- Coordinates: 49°56′42″N 3°07′50″E
- Country: France
- Region: Hauts-de-France
- Department: Somme
- Arrondissement: Péronne
- Canton: Péronne
- Intercommunality: Haute Somme

Government
  - Mayor (2020–2026): Louis Cazier
- Area^{1}: 3.62 km^{2} (1.40 sq mi)
- Elevation: 100 m (330 ft)
- Highest elevation: 141 m (463 ft)
- Lowest elevation: 89 m (292 ft)
- Population (2023): 45
  - Density: 12/km^{2} (32/sq mi)
- Time zone: UTC+01:00 (CET)
  - Summer (DST): UTC+02:00 (CEST)
- INSEE/Postal code: 80435 /80240
- ^{1} French Land Register data, which excludes lakes, ponds, glaciers > 1 km^{2} (0.386 sq mi or 247 acres) and river estuaries.

Hesbécourt is a commune in the Somme department in Hauts-de-France in northern France.

== Geography ==
The commune is situated on the D6e road, some 10 miles (16 km) northwest of Saint-Quentin.

== Population ==
Historical population
Year	Pop.	±% p.a.
1968	115	—
1975	85	−4.23%
1982	71	−2.54%
1990	83	+1.97%
1999	65	−2.68%
2007	61	−0.79%
2012	57	−1.35%
2017	57	+0.00%
2023	45	−3.86%
Source: INSEE

== See also ==
- Communes of the Somme department
