= Research Committee on Sociology of Law =

Research Committee on Sociology of Law (RCSL) was established in 1962 by William M. Evan (University of Pennsylvania) and Adam Podgórecki (University of Warsaw), with the support of Renato Treves (University of Milan) during the congress of the International Sociological Association (ISA), which was held in Weshington D. C. Treves was elected as the first president of the RCSL, Podgórecki as the vice-president and Evan as the Secretary. The RCSL aimed at "opening up a broader range of opportunities for the participation of individual members in the activities of the Association in the field of sociology of law".

The RCSL was initially formed as a largely informal forum to encourage and facilitate exchanges between sociologists of law from different countries. A board was created in 1968, formal by-laws were adopted in 1973, and regular election were organised once every fourth year. The RCSL also holds annual meetings, occasionally together with other similar associations such as the Law and Society Associations or the Socio-Legal Studies Association. The annual meetings are often devoted to specific theoretical and methodological themes, but space is reserved for organising sessions on general topics. The selection of themes and the call for papers are the responsibility of the RCSL board and is carried out in cooperation with the local organising committee. The RCSL board encourages countries not represented by its board members to participate and to submit suggestions for organising its annual meetings.

Since the late 1960s, RCSL has supported the formation of permanent working groups, which focus on various research areas such as comparative studies of legal professions, social and legal systems, comparative legal cultures, gender, law and politics, law and urban space, and family and human rights, in order to promote research in these areas.

On 23 December 1988, the RCSL signed an agreement with government of the Basque Country creating the International Institute for the Sociology of Law in Oñati which is located in the province of Guipúzcoa in the Basque Country in the north of Spain.

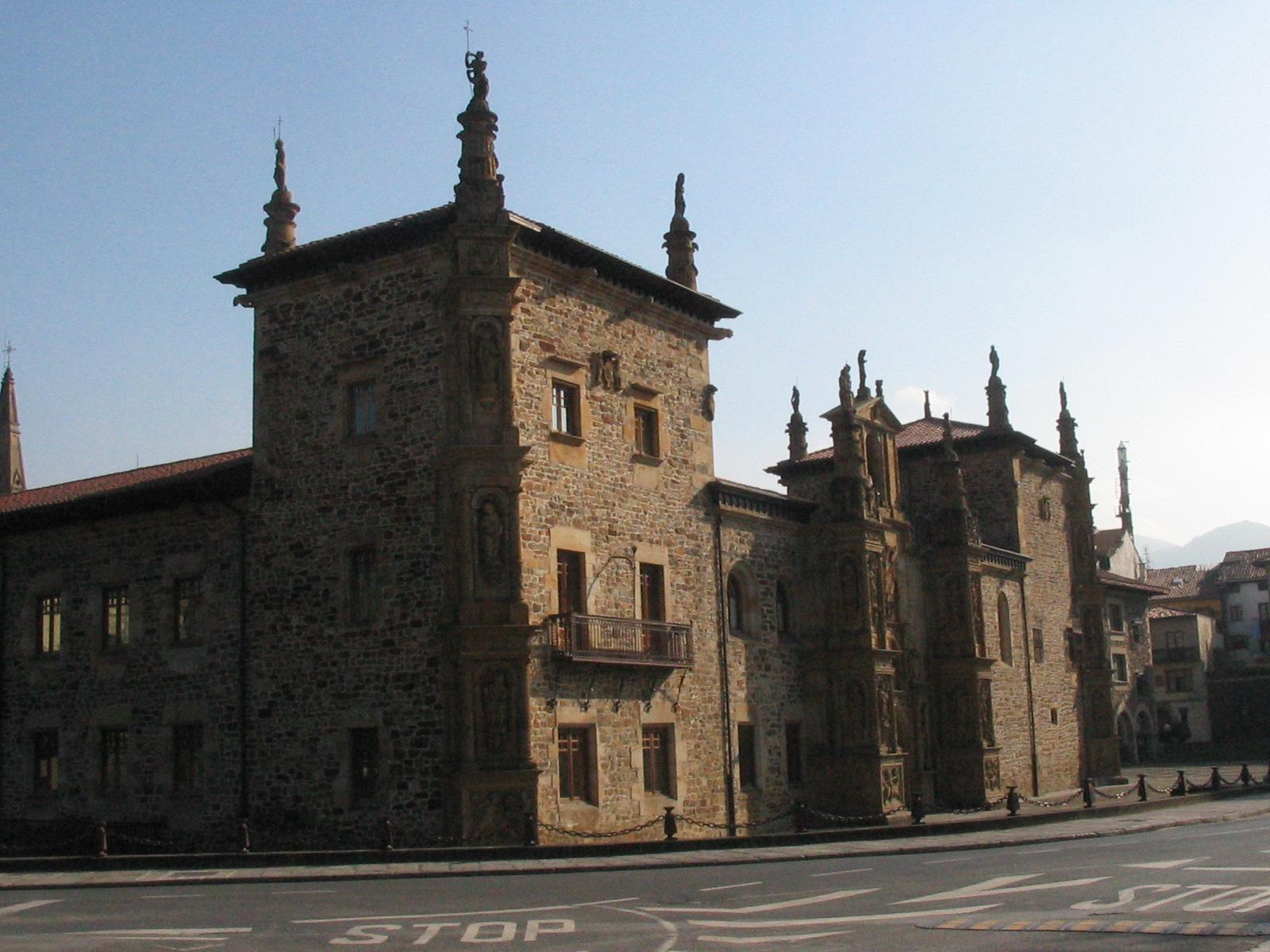
The University of Oñati which houses the International Institute for the Sociology of Law.

Since its establishment in 1962, the RCSL has contributed to the development of the sociology of law by systematically promoting social scientific research about law, legal institutions and legal systems. For more information see the section on sociology of law and the International Institute for the Sociology of Law.

Pierre Guibentif (Potugal)) is currently the president of the RCSL. For previous presidents see https://rcsl.hypotheses.org/introduction#past_presidents

Adam Podgórecki Prize

In honour and memory of the lifetime achievements of Adam Podgórecki and his place in the history of RCSL, the board of RCSL established the annual RCSL Adam Podgórecki Prize at its meeting in 2004. The prize is awarded for outstanding achievements in socio-legal research, either in the form of distinguished and outstanding lifetime achievements in one year or in the form of outstanding scholarship of a socio-legal researcher at an earlier stage of his or her career, in the next year of the award.
