= Maixent Poitevin =

Mayor and Captain of the town of Poitiers in 1566, Poitou, France

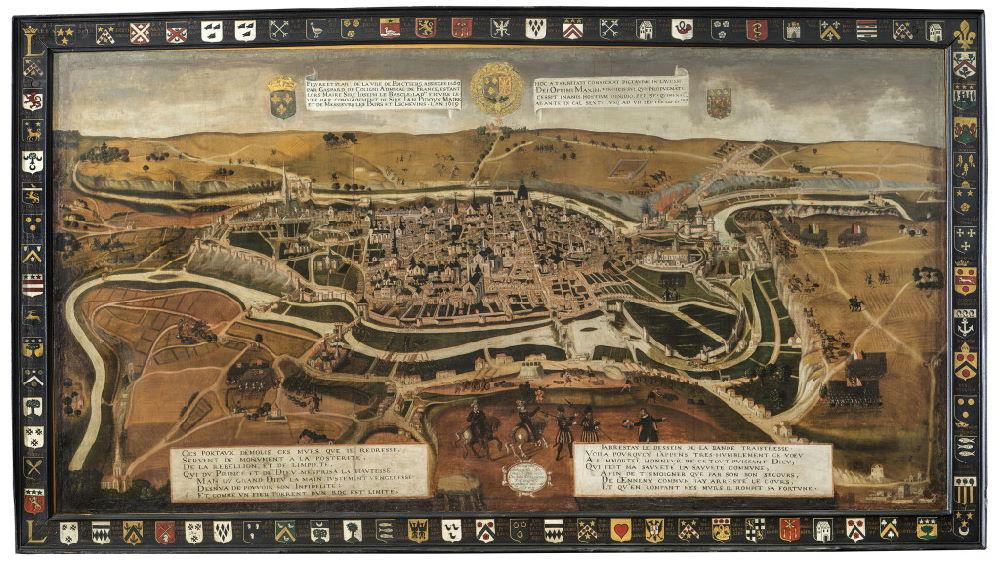
Landscape of Poitiers in 1569, besieged by the Protestant army of Gaspard de Coligny.

Maixent Poitevin (a.k.a. Maixent de La Bidollière), was a 16th Century French squire and jurist.

Barrister and alderman (avocat and echevin) of Poitiers in Poitou, France since September 9, 1559, he eventually became mayor of the town in 1564. He served two one-year terms.

But he had gone down in history for his role as the town's captain when it was besieged in 1569 during the French Wars of Religion - his idea of overflowing the Clain allowed Catholics to keep the city under control.

La Bidollière, died after 1595, was brother of the poet Jean Poitevin.

== Sources ==
- Bernstein, Hilary J. (2004). Between Crown and Community: Politics and Civic Culture in Sixteenth-century Poitiers. Ithaca and London: Cornell University Press. ISBN 0801442346.
- Liberge, Marin (1846). Le Siège de Poitiers (in French). Poitiers: Létang.
- Rédet, Louis (1883). Inventaire des Archives de la ville de Poitiers (in French). Poitiers: Société des antiquaires de l'Ouest (Poitiers, France).
