= Renato Treves =

Renato Treves (1907–1992) was an Italian sociologist.

== Biography ==
Treves was born in Turin, Italy of a Jewish family. According to Vincenzo Ferrari, Treves "devoted his first academic study to the diffusion of Claude Henri de Saint-Simon's (1760–1825) doctrines in Italy" before turning his attention to the neo-Kantian movement and Hans Kelsen's Pure Theory of Law.

Treves also exerted considerable influence on the development of the sociology of law in Italy and is one of the founders of the Research Committee on Sociology of Law.

He kept faith with a Weberian and Kelsenian vision of sociology of law, as distinct from legal science. He advocated empirical research as a means of testing theories critically and favoured open as opposed to closed social portraits of law. Primarily, he argued in favour of a perspectivist and relativistic vision of law and society, combating all kinds of absolutism in both science and politics, from a liberal socialist stance that he upheld in many of his writings.

== Primary publications ==
- Treves, Renato (1933) Il diritto come relazione, Torino.
- Treves, Renato (1941) Sociología y filosofía social, Buenos Aires.
- Treves, Renato (1943) Benedetto Croce, filósofo de la libertad, Buenos Aires.
- Treves, Renato (1947) Diritto e cultura, Torino.
- Treves, Renato (1954) Spirito critico e spirito dogmatico, Milano.
- Treves, Renato (1962) Libertà politica e verità, Milano.
- Treves, Renato (1972) Giustizia e giudici nella società italiana, Bari.
- Treves, Renato (1977) Introduzione alla sociologia del diritto, Torino.
- Treves, Renato (1987) Sociologia del diritto. Origini, ricerche, problemi, Torino.
- Treves, Renato (1990) Sociologia e socialismo. Ricordi e incontri, Milano.

== See also ==
- Sociology of law
- Research Committee on Sociology of Law
