= Guy de Daillon =

- comte du Lude
- Rendition of Lude's coat of arms
- Died: c. 1585
- Father: Jean de Daillon

Guy de Daillon, comte du Lude (-c. 1585) was a French governor and military commander during the French Wars of Religion. The son of Jean de Daillon, governor of Poitou from 1543 to 1557, Lude inherited his position in the province, becoming governor shortly after his father's death. In 1560 the province, which had been a subsidiary governorship under the governorship of Guyenne was reconfigured to an autonomous entity, and given to Antoine of Navarre to buy his loyalty to the Guise regime. Resultingly Lude was given the role of lieutenant-general of the province instead of governor. However this was functionally a promotion as, when governor of Poitou previously he was subordinate to Navarre's authority in Guyenne. Now when Navarre was absent he had the powers of an autonomous governor.

He worked to suppress the Conspiracy of Amboise in the governorship when it arose in 1562 and after Navarre's death during the first war of religion he became the governor of Poitou. Lude was a client of the Guise, and as such during their feud with the House of Montmorency he supported them, swearing to pursue vengeance against the 'killers' of the duc de Guise down to the fourth generation. However this support never materialised in a practical sense and he remained a loyal governor. During the third war of religion the fighting moved into Poitou and when the main Protestant army under Admiral Gaspard II de Coligny moved to besiege Poitiers, Lude vigorously defended the town in alliance with Henri I, Duke of Guise successfully repulsing an assault and forcing the rebels to disengage to face the main royal army under Anjou where they were crushed at Moncontour.

Lude's authority in Poitou was challenged by the militant Catholic hatred of the Peace of Monsieur, with one of his subordinate governors founding a Catholic League to oppose the terms in Fontenay. Lude was displeased with this development, refusing the offer to head the Ligue himself and would spend the next decade trying to best his subordinate governor. He campaigned for the abolishment of the subordinate governor role inside his governorship but was unsuccessful. In 1585 he died and was succeeded to his governorship by his brother-in-law Malicorne.

== Early life and family ==
During his youth, Lude was granted great privilege. He was raised alongside other elite nobles in the household of the children of the king, with Charles IX and Henri III as playmates.

Lude's father Jean de Daillon was governor of Poitou from 1543 to his death in 1557. During this time the governorship was subordinate to that of Guyenne. Jean in turn was the son of Jacques de Daillon the king's chamberlain.

== Reign of François II ==
Having served for several years as governor of Poitou under the authority of Navarre this was reconfigured in 1560 as the province was elevated to autonomy from Guyenne from a subsidiary governate, and granted to Antoine of Navarre alongside his governorship of Guyenne. This would not be the end of the Daillon families involvement with the government of the province however, as in compensation for this change, Lude was granted the role of lieutenant-general of Poitou. Lieutenant generals exercised the powers of governor in the absence of the governor from the province, which meant in effect Lude was the governor of Poitou for the following decades, becoming de jure governor of the region after the death of Navarre during the siege of Rouen. This reconfiguration granted Lude more power, as he acted as de facto governor in his own right, rather than a subordinate governor under a larger governorship as he had prior to 1560.

In opposition to the Guise government, malcontents coalesced into conspiracy, attempting to seize the young king from their protection during the Conspiracy of Amboise. While the conspiracy was a failure numerous local subsidiary uprisings occurred across the areas of France in which the Protestants had greater strength. Lude was instructed to crush the uprisings in Poitou and took about the task with zeal.

== Reign of Charles IX ==
=== Disorder ===
As France spiralled towards civil war in early 1562 the crowns official policy of toleration found itself in conflict even with the lieutenant-general of the kingdom Navarre, who moved into opposition. As a result, there was a great confusion in policy that permeated out into the provinces. Lude complained bitterly that his orders were often contradictory.

In the wake of the first war of religion the crown wrote to Lude, urging him to ensure that the Peace of Amboise, which granted a degree of toleration to Protestantism was upheld in Poitou and that tranquillity was maintained.

=== Feud ===
Failing to achieve victory in their vendetta against the Montmorency through legal channels. The Guise turned to more illicit means in 1563, looking to their clients among the provincial nobility to support them in pursuing their case against the 'killer' of François, Duke of Guise. Lude was receptive to the feelers they sent out, and swore an oath that he would avenge the killing of the duke up to the fourth generation from the killer. While this was an extreme oath, it was modelled on Biblical convention, and his support for the Guise in their cause was more moral than practical, he would remain loyal to the crown.

Lude wrote favourably to the municipal leaders of Poitiers in January 1568, commending them in keeping their town in loyalty to the king, in contrast with the many towns that had seen Protestant coups after the Surprise of Meaux.

=== Third war of religion ===
While the combat of the early civil wars had been centred around the upper Loire and north of France, the Protestant nobility found themselves scattered into Poitou as the third war of religion broke out. As a result, Lude played a key role while the armies of the king's brother Anjou and Condé prince of the blood manoeuvred around each other for advantageous positions. While Lude was not with the main royal army, he commanded the regional defence forces. Already retreating south from the province, a rear guard skirmish cost the Protestants their princely leader, Gaspard II de Coligny extracted the surviving components of the army south to Mussidan.

The Protestants re-entered the province, and at the pressure of Poitvin Protestants Coligny ordered a siege of Poitiers. Lude was held up in the town and found himself put under siege by the Protestant army, shortly before the town was encircled several hundred reinforcements arrived for him under the young Henri I, Duke of Guise eager to make a military reputation for himself. Lude and Guise were besieged in the town from 24 July to 7 September, after a bloodily contested assault was repulsed Coligny lifted the siege. Anjou had recently arrived with the main royal army and Coligny was looking for an excuse to break off the siege. Anjou caught his army as it tried to withdraw, giving the Protestants a devastating defeat on 3 October at Moncontour. Over the entire war Lude complained that the Protestants had done considerable damage to his estates at Magne, writing that the damage was worth over 100,000 livres.

=== Massacre of Saint Bartholomew ===
In the wake of the Massacre of Saint Bartholomew Protestant anger rippled through their strongholds in the south, as communities in which they held overwhelming strength quickly began to enter rebellion. Lude wrote to the king, warning him that the city of La Rochelle was no longer in obedience to him. In response Charles tasked the military leader and new governor of La Rochelle Biron with entering the city to receive its submission. He was refused entry and began a siege, thus starting the fourth war of religion. In the same year Charles chastised Lude for his failure to keep up with nominations for vacant bishoprics and governorships that were subordinate to him, urging him to provide reports on vacancies at least monthly with candidates, with suggestions for who to fill the post.

== Reign of Henri III ==
During the fifth war of religion Lude was informed that several of the gendarme companies under his authority were to be disbanded, being replaced in favour of mercenaries. This left him with only four gendarme companies compared with the eight under his command in 1560.

Strongly opposed to compromise with Protestantism, Lude's subordinate Phillipe de Roches-Baritault reacted with disapproval to news of the Peace of Monsieur that brought the fifth war of religion to a close. The terms of the peace were some of the most generous of the whole wars of religion to Protestantism. In response Roches-Baritault, in his capacity as governor of the town of Fontenay-le-Comte decided to form a Ligue for the 'defence of Catholicism, establishing one such league in Poitiers and Fontenay in 1575. Despite his history of Catholic partisanship Lude reported on these developments to the government and did not accept the governor of Fontenay's attempt to elect him leader. This ligue would not be the most enduring form, with that of Jacques d'Humieres in Peronne becoming the template for a national Ligue.

Over the following decade until his death Lude would find himself in conflict with the governor of Fontenay, who raised taxes for the ligue cause in defiance of Lude's authority and sparred with the governor of Poitou. To this end Lude complained in 1577 to the king that he had not followed through with his 1576 plan to abolish the subordinate governors of his territory.

Upon his death in 1585 the governorship of Poitou was granted to his brother in law Malicorne.

== Sources ==
- Carroll, Stuart (2009). Martyrs and Murderers: The Guise Family and the Making of Europe. Oxford University Press.
- Durot, Éric (2012). François de Lorraine, duc de Guise entre Dieu et le Roi. Classiques Garnier.
- Harding, Robert (1978). Anatomy of a Power Elite: the Provincial Governors in Early Modern France. Yale University Press.
- Jouanna, Arlette (1998). Histoire et Dictionnaire des Guerres de Religion. Bouquins.
- Jouanna, Arlette (2007). The St Bartholomew's Day Massacre: The Mysteries of a Crime of State. Manchester University Press.
- Knecht, Robert (1994). Renaissance Warrior and Patron: The Reign of Francis I. Cambridge University Press.
- Knecht, Robert (2010). The French Wars of Religion, 1559-1598. Routledge.
- Knecht, Robert (2016). Hero or Tyrant? Henry III, King of France, 1574-1589. Routledge.
- Roberts, Penny (2013). Peace and Authority during the French Religious Wars c.1560-1600. Palgrave Macmillan.
- Salmon, J.H.M (1975). Society in Crisis: France during the Sixteenth Century. Metheun & Co.
- Sutherland, Nicola (1980). The Huguenot Struggle for Recognition. Yale University Press.
- Wood, James (2002). The Kings Army: Warfare, Soldiers and Society during the Wars of Religion in France, 1562-1576. Cambridge University Press.
