= Marthe Boyer-Breton =

French artist

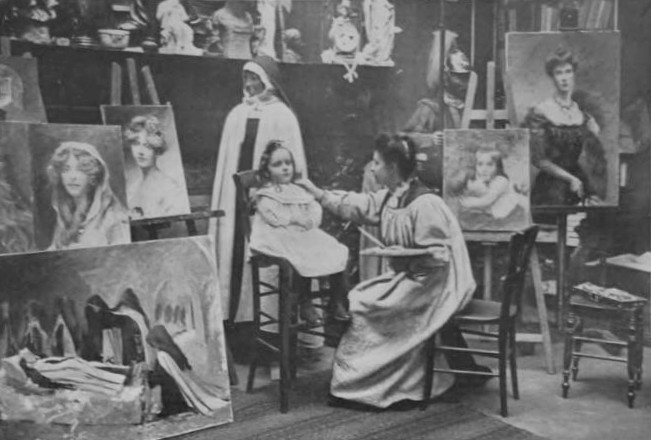
- Marthe Boyer-Breton in her studio, 1905
- Born: Marthe Breton; 1879; Paris, France
- Died: 1926 (aged 46–47)
- Known for: Painting
- Spouse: Augustin Boyer d’Agen

Marthe Marie Louise Boyer-Breton (1879-1926) was a French artist.

== Biography ==
Boyer-Breton née Breton was born in 1879 in Paris. Her teachers included Léon Bonnat, Louis Humbert, and Philippe Parrot. She married the author Jean Auguste Boyer. Boyer-Breton exhibited her work in the Woman's Building at the 1893 World's Columbian Exposition in Chicago, Illinois. She died in 1926.

== Gallery ==
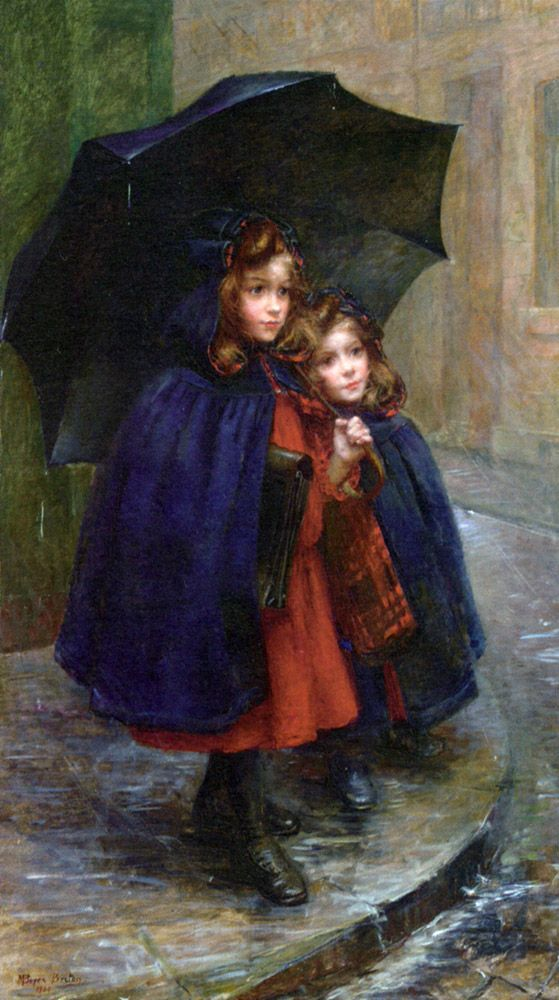
Off to School

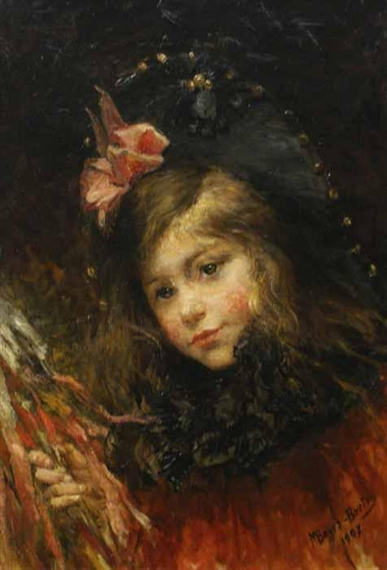
Untitled 1907
