= Christian Amalvi =

French academic (born 1954)

Christian Amalvi (born 23 April 1954) is a French academic, professor of contemporary history and former lecturer at the University of Montpellier (1991–2023), known for his works on contemporary history.

== Early life and education ==
Born on 23 April 1954, Montauban, Amalvi attended the École Nationale des Chartes from 1974 to 1978 and became a curator at the National Library of France (1978–1991).

He taught at the University of Montpellier from 1991 to 1998, and became a professor of contemporary history after Charles-Olivier Carbonell, who was his doctoral supervisor. Upon retiring in January 2023, he is a member of the Académie des sciences et lettres de Montpellier.

== Works ==
Amalavi's 1978 thesis at the École des Chartes was entitled La « galerie des hommes illustres » de l'histoire de France dans l'enseignement primaire de 1833 à 1914 (The "Gallery of Famous Men" from French history in primary education from 1833 to 1914). In 1979, he used that thesis to publish his first work dedicated to the iconography of scholarly heroes in French history during the Third Republic, analysing that iconography as part of a national mythology.

In 1988, Amalvi published a book entitled De l'art et la manière d'accommoder les héros de l'histoire de France, made up of seven different studies on the representation of heroes and of historical episodes in national history in the 19th and 20th centuries. His 1996 work Le goût du Moyen Âge examined the historiographical destiny of major figures from the Middle Ages and examined the public's interest in that period, which he associated initially with history teaching at primary level. In 2001, he published Répertoire des auteurs de manuels scolaires et de livres de vulgarisation historique de langue française de 1660 à 1960

Amalvi was also a member of the Haut comité des commémorations nationales, established in 1998 as the Haut comité aux célébrations nationales He and nine other members of that committee (Marie-Laure Bernadac, Gilles Cantagrel, Nicole Garnier, Claude Gauvard, Robert Halleux, Jean-Noël Jeanneney, Évelyne Lever, Pascal Ory and Jacques Perot) resigned in a joint open letter published in Le Monde in March 2018. He also protested against the Minister of Culture Françoise Nyssen's decision to remove Charles Maurras's name from the Livre des commémorations nationales 2018.

In 2004, he edited the Dictionnaire biographique des historiens français et francophones.

== Publications ==
=== As author ===
- Les Héros de l'histoire de France : recherche iconographique sur le panthéon scolaire de la Troisième République. Regard/Histoire. Paris: Phot'œil. 1979. p. 315. ISBN 978-2863530108.
- De l'art et la manière d'accommoder les héros de l'histoire de France - De Vercingétorix à la Révolution. Essais de mythologie nationale. L'aventure humaine. Paris: Albin Michel. 1988. p. 473. ISBN 9782226035110.
- Le goût du Moyen Âge. Paris: Plon. 1996. ISBN 978-2259180498.
- Répertoire des auteurs de manuels scolaires et de livres de vulgarisation de 1660 à 1960. Paris: La Boutique de l'Histoire. 2001. p. 288..
- Les héros des Français - Controverses autour de la mémoire nationale. Bibliothèque historique. Paris: Larousse. 2011. p. 448. ISBN 9782035839817..
- Ces lieux qui racontent l'histoire de France. Paris: Larousse. 2019. p. 224. ISBN 9782035979766..

=== As editor ===
- Une passion de l'histoire - Hommage au professeur Charles-Olivier Carbonell. Toulouse: Privately published. 2001. p. 387. ISBN 978-2708958029..
- Dictionnaire biographique des historiens français et francophones de Grégoire de Tours à Georges Duby. Paris: La Boutique de l'Histoire. 2004. p. 366. ISBN 978-2910828325.
- Les lieux de l'histoire. Paris: Armand Colin. 2005. p. 411. ISBN 9782200267223..
- Images militantes, images de propagande - Actes du 132e Congrès national des sociétés historiques et scientifiques, Arles 2007. Actes des congrès nationaux des sociétés historiques et scientifiques. Paris: CTHS. 2010..
- Usages savants et partisans des biographies, de l'Antiquité au XXIe siècle - Actes du 134e Congrès national des sociétés historiques et scientifiques, « Célèbres ou obscurs : hommes et femmes dans leurs territoires et leur histoire », Bordeaux, 2009. Actes des congrès nationaux des sociétés historiques et scientifiques. Vol. 134. Paris: CTHS. 2011.
- Annales du Midi : revue archéologique, historique et philologique de la France méridionale - Religion et politique dans la France méridionale à l'époque contemporaine. Vol. 274. Toulouse: Privately published. 2011..
- Jeanne d'Arc entre la terre et le soleil du midi - Regards méridionaux sur la bonne Lorraine, XVème-XXIème siècle. Michel Houdiard. 2012. p. 277. ISBN 9782356920898..
- Histoire de Montpellier. Toulouse: Privately published. 2015. p. 925.
- Histoire du Tarn. Histoire Des Villes. Toulouse: Privately published. 2018. p. 1018. ISBN 9782708983809..
- Ombres et lumières du Sud de la France. Les lieux de mémoire du Midi. Paris: Les Indes savantes. 2015–2016. pp. 368+527 p.
