= Mialet, Gard =

Mialet
- Commune
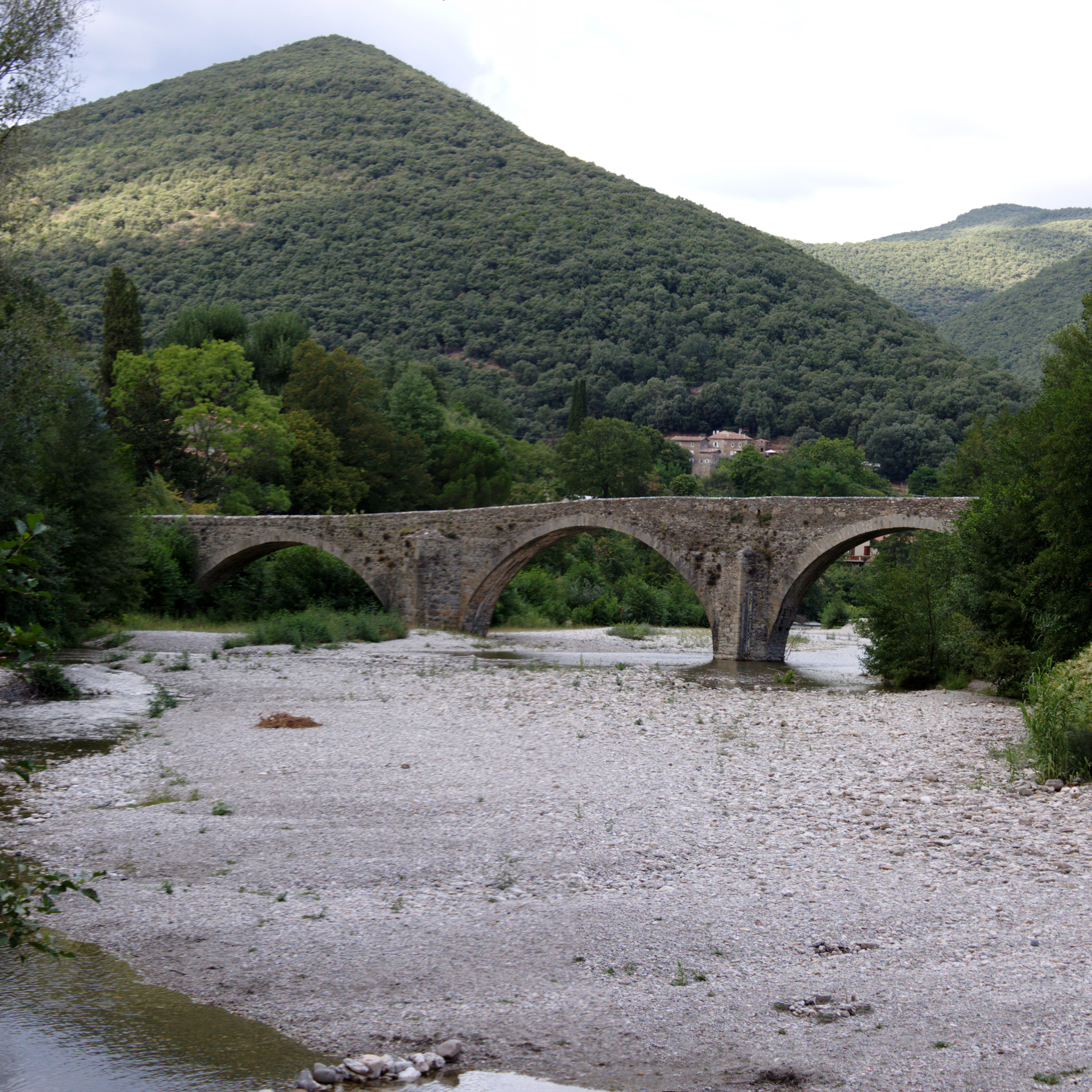
- The Pont des Camisards in Mialet

- Coat of arms
- Location of Mialet
- Location within France Location within Occitanie
- Coordinates: 44°06′42″N 3°56′37″E
- Country: France
- Region: Occitania
- Department: Gard
- Arrondissement: Alès
- Canton: La Grand-Combe
- Intercommunality: Alès Agglomération

Government
  - Mayor (2020–2026): Jack Verriez
- Area^{1}: 30.76 km^{2} (11.88 sq mi)
- Elevation: 165 m (541 ft)
- Highest elevation: 691 m (2,267 ft)
- Lowest elevation: 140 m (460 ft)
- Population (2023): 628
  - Density: 20.4/km^{2} (52.9/sq mi)
- Time zone: UTC+01:00 (CET)
  - Summer (DST): UTC+02:00 (CEST)
- INSEE/Postal code: 30168 /30140
- ^{1} French Land Register data, which excludes lakes, ponds, glaciers > 1 km^{2} (0.386 sq mi or 247 acres) and river estuaries.

Mialet (French pronunciation: [mjalɛ]; Occitan: Mialet) is a commune in the Gard department in southern France.

It lies close to Alès and Saint-Jean-du-Gard.

The commune includes the hamlet of Mas Soubeyran, centre of the Protestant resistance during the 16th century. It houses the Musée du Désert, dedicated to the history of Protestantism in France.

== History ==
The town's entire population was expelled by French troops on 1 April 1703, during the War of the Camisards.

== Population ==
Historical population
Year	Pop.	±% p.a.
1968	371	—
1975	354	−0.67%
1982	449	+3.45%
1990	511	+1.63%
1999	539	+0.59%
2007	558	+0.43%
2012	592	+1.19%
2017	624	+1.06%
2023	628	+0.11%
Source: INSEE

== Sights ==
- Bridge, the Pont des camisards
- Mas Soubeyran, known for its annual Protestant gatherings

== Notable residents ==
Rolland, or Rolland Laporte, from his real name Pierre Laporte, born 3 January 1680, died 14 April 1704, was a Camisard chief in the Cévennes, nicknamed «le Général des enfants de Dieu» (general of the children of God). His birth house is now the Musée du Désert.

== See also ==
- Communes of the Gard department
