= Musée du Désert =

Coordinates: 44°05′45″N 3°57′26″E

The Huguenot cross

Le Musée du Désert is a museum dedicated to the history of Protestantism in France, particularly in the Cévennes. Its name refers to the Désert, the period between the Revocation of the Edict of Nantes and the Edict of Versailles (1685–1787) during which Protestantism was illegal in France.

The museum, formerly the house of the Camisard leader, Roland Laporte, is situated at Mas Soubeyran, in the commune of Mialet, département Gard, not far from Alès and Nîmes. Amid typically Cévenol settings, it presents documents and artifacts of the period, such as the preaching chairs used by the pastors, designed to be easily hidden and transported. It is open from March 1 to November 30.

== Assemblée du Désert ==
Every year, on the first Sunday of September, between 15 000 and 20 000 Protestants come to the museum from all over France, and from Switzerland, Germany, the Netherlands, Britain, Denmark, Ireland, the US, and South Africa, for the Assemblée du Désert, first held on 24 September 1911.

After morning communion, the afternoon is filled with panel discussions on various subjects, depending on the year, and frequently commemorating some event or person. On 6 September 2009, the theme was the 500th birthday of Jean Calvin; on 5 September 2010, the theme was the 250th anniversary of the death of Antoine Court.

The day traditionally closes with the hymn La Cévenole (1885).
