= Patrick Cabanel =

French historian (born 1961)

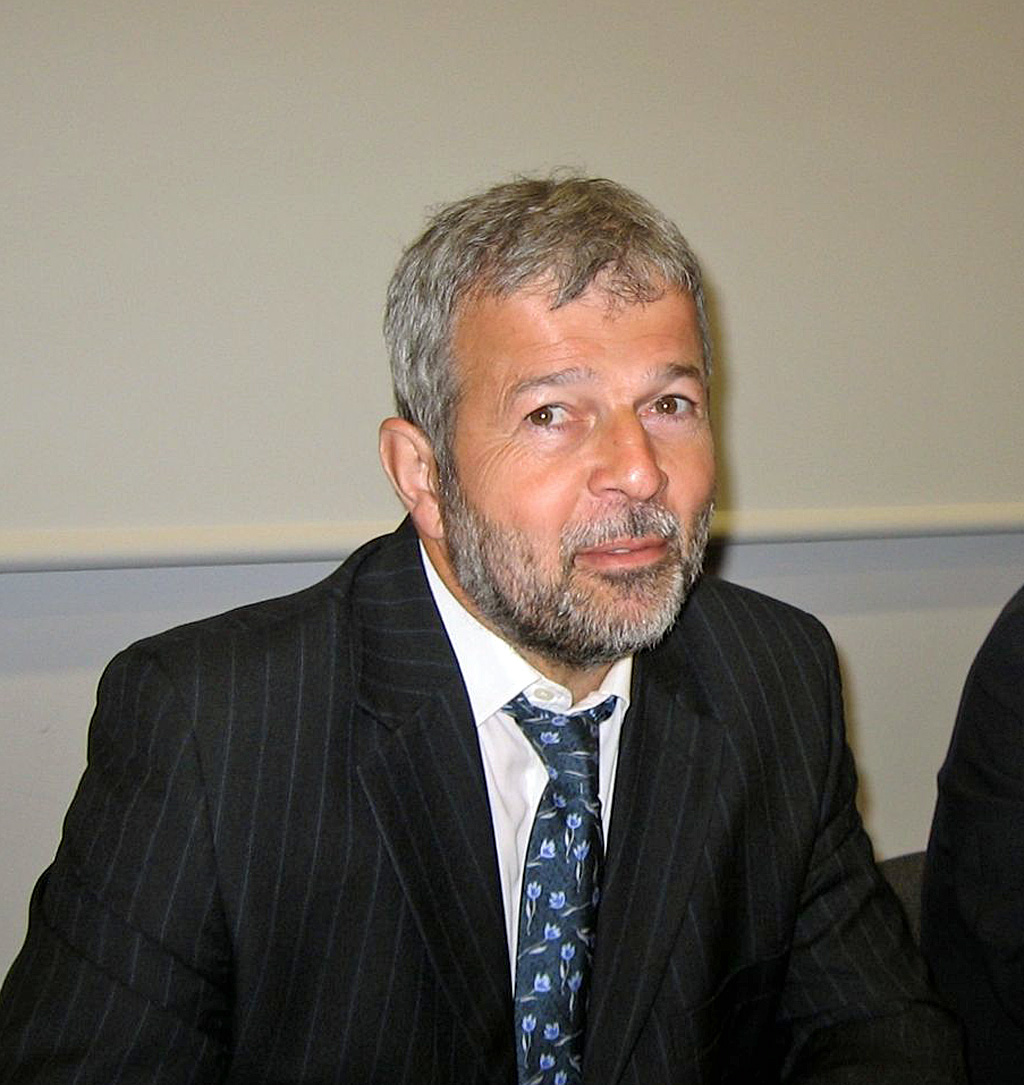
Cabanel in 2012

Patrick Cabanel (born 22 February 1961) is a French historian, director of studies at the École pratique des hautes études and holder of the chair in Histoire et sociologie des protestantismes. He mainly writes on the history of religious minorities, the construction of a secularised French Republic and French resistance to the Holocaust.

== Life ==
He was born in Alès and studied at the lycée Alphonse-Daudet.

== Publications ==
=== Author ===
- Les Protestants et la République, de 1870 à nos jours, Complexe, 2000.
- Les Mots de la religion dans l'Europe contemporaine, Presses universitaires du Mirail, 2001.
- Trames religieuses et paysages culturels dans l'Europe du XIXe siècle, Seli Arslan, 2002.
- La République du certificat d'études. Histoire et anthropologie d'un examen, Belin, 2002.
- Le Dieu de la République (1860-1900), Presses universitaires de Rennes, 2003.
- Les Mots de la laïcité, Presses universitaires du Mirail, 2004.
- Juifs et protestants en France, les affinités électives : xvie – xxie siècle, Fayard, 2004.
- 1905. La Séparation des Églises et de l'État, Geste Éditions, coll. « 30 questions », 2005.
- Cévennes. Un jardin d’Israël, Cahors, La Louve éditions, 2e éd., 2006.
- La Tour de Constance et Le Chambon-sur-Lignon. L'oubli et le royaume, Cahors, La Louve éditions, 2007.
- Entre religions et laïcité. La voie française, xixe – xxie siècle, Privat, 2007.
- Le Tour de la nation par des enfants. Romans scolaires et espaces nationaux, XIXe - XXIe siècle, Belin, 2007.
- Voyage en religions. Histoire des lieux de culte en Languedoc et Roussillon, Nouvelles Presses du Languedoc, 2007.
- Chère mademoiselle… - Alice Ferrières et les enfants cachés de Murat, Éditions Calmann-Lévy, 2010
- Histoire des Justes en France, Armand Colin, 2012
- Résister. Voix protestantes, Alcide, 2012
- Histoire des protestants en France, Fayard, 2012
- De la paix aux résistances. Les protestants en France 1930-1945, Fayard, 2015, ISBN 2213685762
- La Question nationale au xix siècle, La Découverte, coll. « Repères », éd. 2015 [1997].
- Ferdinand Buisson. Père de l'école laïque, Labor et Fides, 2016
- Le Protestantisme français, la belle histoire xvie – xxie siècle, Alcide, 2017
- Alexis Muston Journal (1825-1850), Grenoble, PUG, coll. « La Pierre et l'écrit », 2018
- Nous devions le faire, nous l’avons fait, c’est tout. Cévennes, l’histoire d’une terre de refuge, 1940-1944, Alcide, 2018, ISBN 978-2375910306
- 1942. Mgr Saliège, une voix contre la déportation des juifs, Portet-sur-Garonne, Éditions Midi-Pyrénéennes, 2018
- Histoire des Cévennes, PUF, coll. « Que sais-je ? », no. 3342 8e éd. 2019 [1998] ISBN 9782715400115.
- La Maison sur la montagne. Le Coteau fleuri, 1942-1945, Albin Michel, 2019, p.|257
- Deux peintres du refuge : artistes juifs dans les Cévennes (1942-1944), Alcide, 2020 ISBN 978-2-3759-1053-5.
- Évangéliser en France au xx siècle : histoire de La Cause (1920-2020), Paris, La Cause, 2021 ISBN 978-2-8765-7134-1.

=== Editor ===
- Dire les Cévennes - Mille ans de témoignages, preface by Philippe Joutard, Presses du Languedoc/Club cévenol, 1994
- La Tunisie mosaïque, diasporas, cosmopolitisme, archéologie de l’identité, with Jacques Alexandropoulos, Presses universitaires du Mirail, 2000.
- Questions de démocratie, co-edited with Jean-Marc Février, Presses universitaires du Mirail, 2000.
- Les Camisards et leur mémoire 1702-2002, with Philippe Joutard, (international colloquum), Presses du Languedoc, Sète 2002. ISBN 2-85998-269-8.
- La Deuxième Guerre mondiale, des terres de refuge aux musées, with Laurent Gervereau, Le Chambon-sur-Lignon, 2003.
- La Fabrique des nations. Figures de l'État-nation dans l'Europe du ix siècle, with Michel Bertrand and Bertrand de Lafargue, Les Éditions de Paris, 2003.
- Un modèle d'intégration. Juifs et israélites en France et en Europe, xixe – xxe siècles, with Chantal Bordes-Benayoun, Berg International, 2004.
- Religions, pouvoir et violence, with Michel Bertrand, Presses universitaires du Mirail, 2005.
- Le Grand Exil des congrégations religieuses françaises 1901-1914, with Jean-Dominique Durand, éd. du Cerf, 2005.
- Cévennes, terre de refuge (1940-1944), with Philippe Joutard and Jacques Poujol, 5e éd. Nouvelles Presses du Languedoc, 2012 [1987].
- Une France en Méditerranée. Écoles, langue et culture françaises, xixe – xxe siècles, Créaphis, 2006.
- Lettres d'exil 1901-1909. Les congrégations françaises dans le monde après les lois laïques de 1901 et 1904, Turnhout, Brepols, 2008.
- Le Siècle des excès, with Patrice Touchard, Christine Bermond-Bousquet, Maxime Lefebvre, PUF, 7e éd., 2010.
- Histoire régionale de la Shoah, with Jacques Fijalkow, Les Éditions de Paris, 2011.
- La montagne refuge - Accueil et sauvetage des juifs autour du Chambon-sur-Lignon, with Philippe Joutard, Jacques Sémelin, Annette Wieviorka, Albin Michel, 2013.
- Les Cévennes au XXI siècle, une renaissance, Alcide, 2014.
- Dictionnaire biographique des protestants français de 1787 à nos jours, tome 1, A-C (2015) and tome 2, D-G (2020), with André Encrevé, éditions de Paris/Max Chaleil, XXVI-831 p. ISBN 978-2846211901.
- Croire, s’engager, chercher. Autour de Jean Baubérot, du protestantisme à la laïcité, with Valentine Zuber and Raphaël Liogier, Turnhout, Brepols, 2016 ISBN 978-2-503-56749-5.
- La Saga Bost. Une famille protestante (xviie – xxie siècle), with Laurent Gervereau, Genève, Labor et Fides, 2017 ISBN 9782830916195.
- Protestantismes, convictions & engagements. Colloque international, historique & interreligieux, Olivétan, 2019

== Awards ==
- 1988 : prix Pays-Protestants for Cévennes, terre de refuge (1940-1944).
- 2005 : Cabri d'or for Cévennes, un jardin d'Israël.
- 2012 :
  - chevalier of the Légion d'honneur.
  - prix Philippe-Viannay for Histoire des Justes en France
- 2013 : prix Le-Dissez-de-Penanrun from the Académie des sciences morales et politiques

== See also ==
- Legion of Honour
- List of Legion of Honour recipients by name (C)
- Legion of Honour Museum
