= Elin =

- Gender: Female
- Language: Old Norse, Welsh

Other names
- Alternative spelling: Elín
- Related names: Elna; Ellen; Helene

Elin or Elín is a variation of Ellen and Helene used in Scandinavian and Celtic languages. Notable people with the name include:

== A–K ==
- Elin Rodum Agdestein (born 1957), Norwegian politician
- Elin Åhlin (born 1990), Swedish sport shooter
- Elin Airamo (1886–1971), Finnish politician
- Elin Améen (1852–1913), Swedish author
- Elin Andersdotter (died 1569), Swedish lady-in-waiting
- Elin Andersson (born 1981), Swedish politician
- Elin Arvidsson (born 1992), Swedish professional golfer
- Elin Austevoll (born 1974), Norwegian swimmer
- Elin Ekblom Bak (born 1981), Swedish football midfielder
- Elin Bakkerud (born 1973), Norwegian footballer
- Elin Bergblom (born 1982), Swedish badminton player
- Elin Bergkvist (born 1994), Swedish footballer
- Elin Bergman (born 1995), Swedish singer
- Elin Lerum Boasson (born 1978), Norwegian environmentalist
- Elin Borg (born 1990), Swedish football defender
- Elin Bragnum (born 1994), Swedish football midfielder
- Elin Brandell (1882–1963), Swedish journalist and author
- Elín Briem (1856–1937), Icelandic cookbook writer
- Elin Brodin (born 1963), Norwegian novelist
- Elin Cederroos (born 1985), Swedish boxer
- Elin Cullhed (born 1983), Swedish writer
- Elin Danielson-Gambogi (1861–1919), Finnish painter
- Elin C. Danien (1929–2019), American anthropologist
- Elin Ek (cross-country skier) (born 1973), Swedish cross-country skier
- Elin Ek (actress) (born 1976), Swedish radio, television presenter and producer
- Elin Eldebrink (born 1988), Swedish basketball player
- Elin Engström (1860–1957), Swedish politician and trade unionist
- Elin Falk (1872–1942), Swedish gymnastics pioneer
- Elin Fflur (born 1984), Welsh singer-songwriter
- Elin Floberghagen (born 1969), Norwegian journalist and organizational leader
- Elin Flyborg (born 1976), Swedish footballer
- Elin Fohström (1868–1949), Finnish operatic soprano
- Elin Grindemyr (born 1983), Swedish model
- Elín Ebba Gunnarsdóttir (born 1953), Icelandic writer
- Elin Gustafsson (born 1989), Swedish politician
- Elin Gustavsdotter (died 1495), Swedish noblewoman
- Elín Hall (born 1998), Icelandic-Canadian musician and actress
- Elin Hallagård (born 1989), Swedish handball player
- Elin Hansson (born 1996), Swedish handball player
- Elin Harlow (born 1993), Welsh squash player
- Elin Brimheim Heinesen (born 1958), Faroese journalist
- Elin Hilderbrand (born 1969), American romance novelist
- Elín Hirst (born 1960), Icelandic politician
- Elin Hjelmestam (born 1999), Swedish politician
- Elin Holmlöv (born 1987), Swedish ice hockey player
- Elin i Horsnäs, Alleged Swedish witch
- Elín Sóley Hrafnkelsdóttir (born 1998), Icelandic basketball player
- Elin Jacobsson (1886–1978), Swedish civil engineer
- Elín Metta Jensen (born 1995), Icelandic footballer
- Elin Johansson (born 1990), Swedish taekwondo practitioner
- Elin Johansson (footballer) (born 1992), Swedish footballer
- Elin Jones (born 1966), Welsh politician
- Elin Kallio (1859–1927), Finnish gymnast
- Elin Kling (born 1983), Swedish fashion journalist
- Elin Klinga (born 1969), Swedish actress
- Elin Kristiansen (born 1968), Norwegian biathlete
- Elin Kvande (born 1951), Norwegian sociologist and gender researcher

== L–W ==
- Elin Anna Labba (born 1980), Swedish Sámi author
- Elin Landström (born 1992), Swedish footballer
- Elin Lanto (born 1984), Swedish singer
- Elin Lauritzen (1916–2006), Swedish family lawyer
- Elin Lindqvist (born 1982), Swedish writer
- Elin Lundberg (born 1993), Swedish ice hockey player
- Elin Lundgren (born 1978), Swedish politician
- Elín Rósa Magnúsdóttir (born 2002), Icelandic handballer
- Elin Magnusson (born 1982), Swedish footballer
- Elin Mattsson (born 1986), Swedish biathlete
- Elin McCoy, American wine critic
- Elin McCready, American linguist
- Elin Nilsen (born 1968), Norwegian cross-country skier
- Elin Nilsson (born 1982), Swedish politician
- Elin Nordegren (born 1980), Swedish model and nanny
- Elin Alfhild Nordlund (1861–1941), Finnish painter
- Elin Nyman (born 1991), Swedish footballer
- Elin Ohlsson (born 1979), Swedish professional golfer
- Elin Ørjasæter (born 1962), Norwegian writer
- Elín Ortiz (1934–2016), Puerto Rican actor
- Elin Östlund (born 1992), Swedish sprinter
- Elin Pelin (1877–1949), Bulgarian writer
- Elín Petersdóttir (born 1972), Icelandic-Finnish actor
- Elin Pikkuniemi (1895–1988), Swedish cross-country skier
- Elin Reimer (1928–2022), Danish actress
- Elin Pudas Remler (born 2004), Swedish golfer
- Elin Rombo (born 1976), Swedish operatic soprano
- Elin Rosseland (born 1959), Norwegian singer, bandleader, and composer
- Elin Rubensson (born 1993), Swedish footballer
- Elin Såger (1614–1669), Finnish businessperson
- Elin Segerlind (born 1985), Swedish politician
- Elín Sigurðardóttir (born 1973), Icelandic swimmer
- Elín Edda Sigurðardóttir (born 1989), Icelandic long-distance runner
- Elin Sigvardsson (born 1981), Swedish singer
- Elin Sjöström (1851–1936), Finnish writer
- Elin of Skövde (died 1164), Swedish saint
- Elin O'Hara Slavick, American artist and poet
- Elin Söderberg (born 1984), Swedish politician
- Elin i Staxäng (died 1671), Swedish folk healer executed for witchcraft
- Elin Suleymanov (born 1970), Azerbaijani diplomat
- Elin Svensson (1879–1960), Swedish missionary
- Elin Manahan Thomas (born 1977), Welsh soprano
- Elín Þorsteinsdóttir (born 1996), Icelandic handball player
- Elin Topuzakov (born 1977), Bulgarian footballer and manager
- Elin Törnudd (1924–2008), Finnish chief librarian
- Elin Tvete (born 1976), Norwegian politician
- Elin Wägner (1882–1949), Swedish writer, journalist and Suffragette
- Elin Wahlström (born 1993), Swedish footballer
- Elin Wallin (1884–1969), Swedish artist
- Elin Westerlund (born 1990), Swedish hurdler
- Elin Williams, Welsh disability blogger (blurred vision)
