= Simon Söfelde =

Swedish composer and musician

Simon Söfelde (born 23 November 1988 in Gothenburg) is a Swedish composer. and musician, active in both art music and popular music genres.

== Biography ==
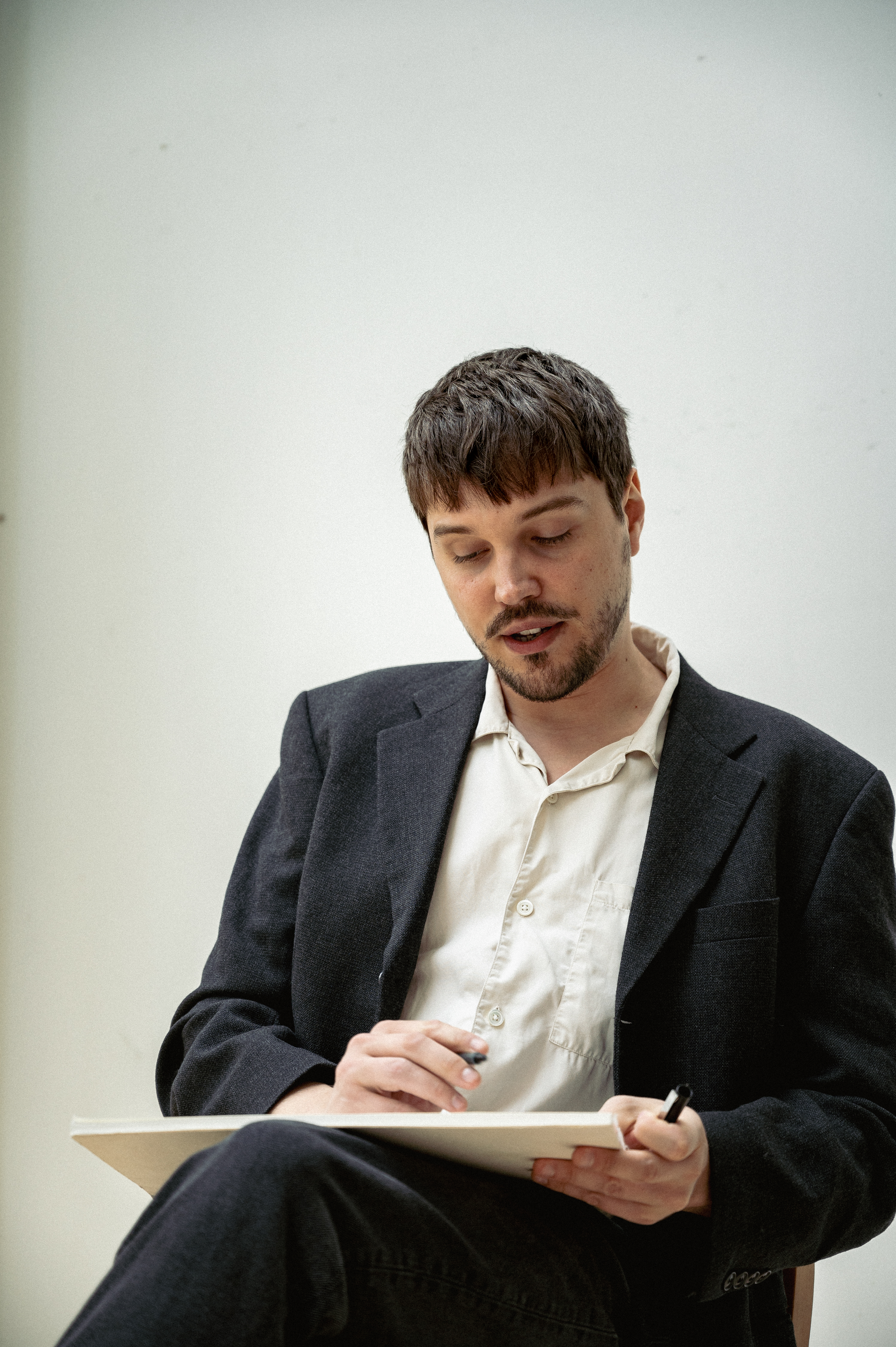
Simon Söfelde

Söfelde pursued his studies in composition at the Gotland School of Music Composition and the Malmö Academy of Music, where he was mentored by composers such as Luca Francesconi, Bent Sørensen, Rolf Martinsson, and Hans Gefors. He furthered his education at the University of Music and Performing Arts in Vienna, studying under Detlev Müller-Siemens.

== Career ==
Söfelde's compositional work includes a diverse range of genres, from chamber music to film scores. His compositions have been performed internationally by orchestras and ensembles such as the Brussels Philharmonic, the Malmö Symphony Orchestra, Ensemble mise-en (US), CHROMA (UK), the Béla Quartet (FR), the Kreutzer Quartet and the Norrköping Symphony Orchestra. The Royal Swedish Academy of Music awarded him the Carin Malmlöf-Forsslings Composers Prize 2026, as well as the Christ Johnson Prize 2025 presented by His Majesty the King for the orchestral work Fugato. Additionally, he has a substantial background as an arranger, producer, and musical director, collaborating with artists like Albin Lee Meldau, Arvid Nero, and Elin Ruth Sigvardsson

As a performer he has appeared on international stages, including Tiny Desk, SXSW, Bonnaroo Music and Arts, Brooklyn Steel, the O2 Arena, Dreamland (UK), the Reeperbahn Festival, the Roskilde Festival and Funkhaus Berlin. In Sweden he has performed at some of the country's biggest venues such as Gröna Lund, Liseberg, Tele2 Arena, Scandinavium and Peace and Love music festival. He has also appeared multiple times on television and radio, including Nyhetsmorgon, Inas Nacht with Ina Müller, and BBC2

== Selected works ==
=== Orchestral works ===
- Minnenas Skeende (2019) for symphony orchestra
- Åtta gester (Eight Gestures) (2018) for wind orchestra
- Fugato (2015) for symphony orchestra (revised in 2017, 2019, 2020)
- Six Movements for Orchestra (2014) for symphony orchestra
- Slitningar (2014) for string orchestra
- Overture (2012) for symphony orchestra
- Wind Orchestra Piece (2009)

=== Chamber music ===
- Gycklarmusik 17 (Passacaglia) (2022) for violin and piano
- Gycklarmusik 15 (Joker Music) (2021) for viola da gamba
- Fanfar (2018) for ensemble
- Gycklarmusik 16 (Joker Music) (2018) for string quartet
- Correspondences (2018) for string quartet and piano
- Lika (2018) for guitar and accordion
- Gycklarmusik 11–14 (Joker Music) (2017) for flute
- Gycklarmusik 10 (Joker Music) (2018) for guitar
- Gycklarmusik 5–9 (Joker Music) (2015) for flute, clarinet, harp, vibraphone, and piano
- Gycklarmusik 1–4 (Joker Music) (2014) for solo violin
- Slitningar (2014) for string quartet or string orchestra
- Vändpunkter (Turning Points) (2014) for ensemble, inspired by Robert Azar's poem with the same name
- Trio for Bassoon, Violin and Piano (2012)
- Trio for Clarinet in Bb, Violoncello and Piano (2012)
- Kreutzer Variations (2011) for string quartet

=== Instrumental works ===
- Morendo (2015) for piano
- Fantasia for Flute (2011) for solo flute
- Piece for Guitar (2010)
- Piano Suite (2010)

=== Vocal music ===
- Madrigalerna (Madrigals) (2025) for lyric soprano and piano, text by Karl Appelgren
- Transatlantic Poems (2020) for 2 sopranos and mezzo a cappella
- Appelgrensånger (2014) for soprano, clarinet, trombone, violin, and piano, text by Karl Appelgren
- Staden (2012) for mixed choir
- Missa Brevis for mixed choir a cappella
- Schlussstück for soprano and chamber ensemble, text by R.M. Rilke

=== Other works ===
- Tillvaron (2014), chamber opera
- Triple Concerto (2012) for harpsichord, piano, Hammond organ, and electronics
- Calm (2014) (EAM)
- Fly or Die Trying (2013) (EAM)
- Reflections on Reflections in Water (2011) (EAM and live electronics)

=== Film music ===
- Bang Bang (2023) (dir. Vincent Grashaw)
- After Work (2023)
- Rymdskrot (Miss Julie) (2013)

== Selected discography ==
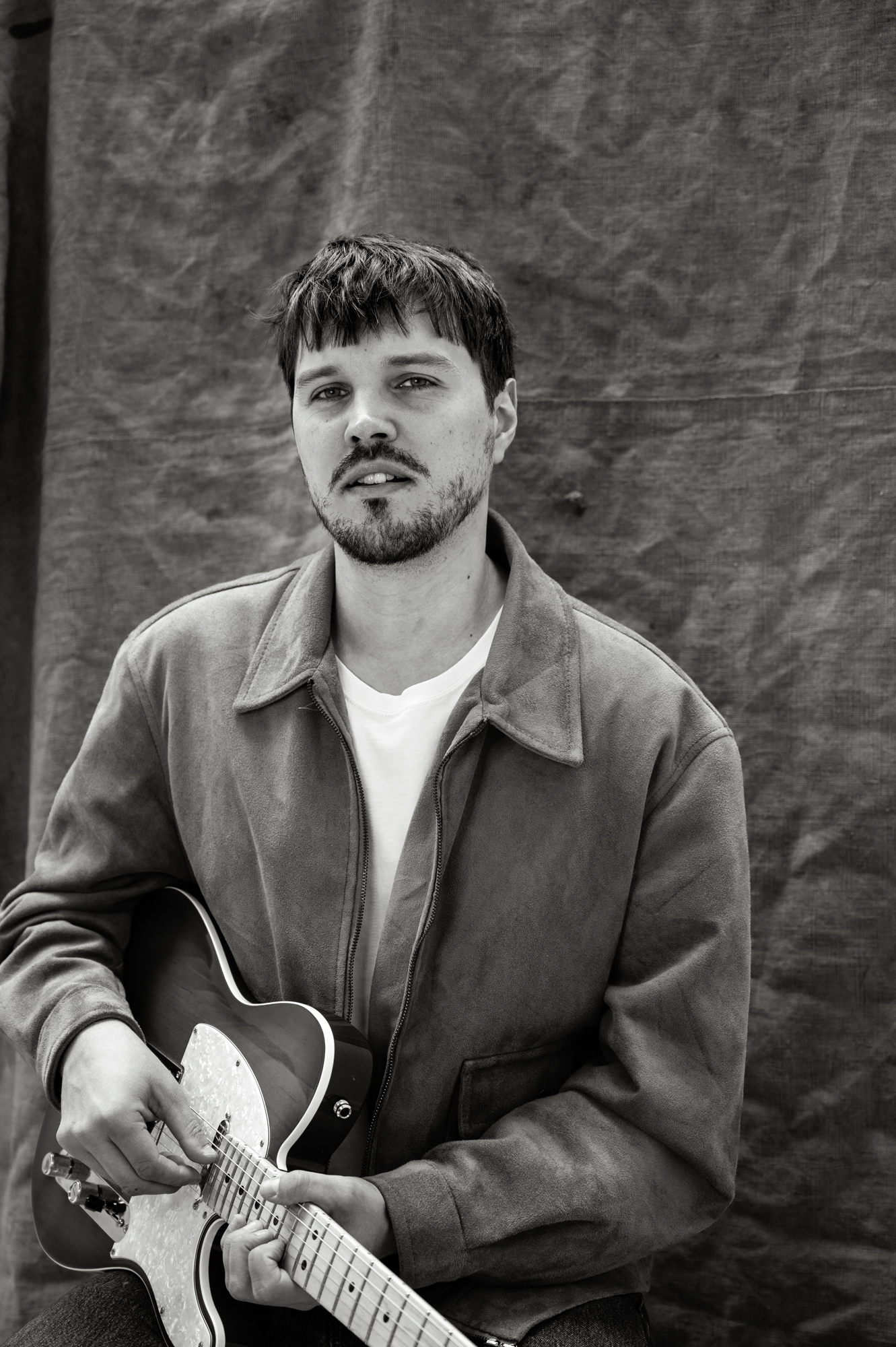
Simon Söfelde backstage with his Telecaster at a festival in 2024

=== As arranger and producer ===
- Tilde – Anywhere but Here (2025), Vacanze Records
- Arvid Nero – Just Idag Är Jag Stark (2025), Mayfly Recordings
- Albin Lee Meldau – Hommage på svenska (2023), Universal / Mayfly Recordings
- Orchestral Awakenings (2023), Catapult Music/BMG
- Albin Lee Meldau – På svenska (2020), Sony Music Entertainment Sweden AB
- Albin Lee Meldau – Merry Little Christmas EP (2019), Sony Music Entertainment Sweden AB
- The Magnolia – First Time (2015), SwingKids

=== As musician ===
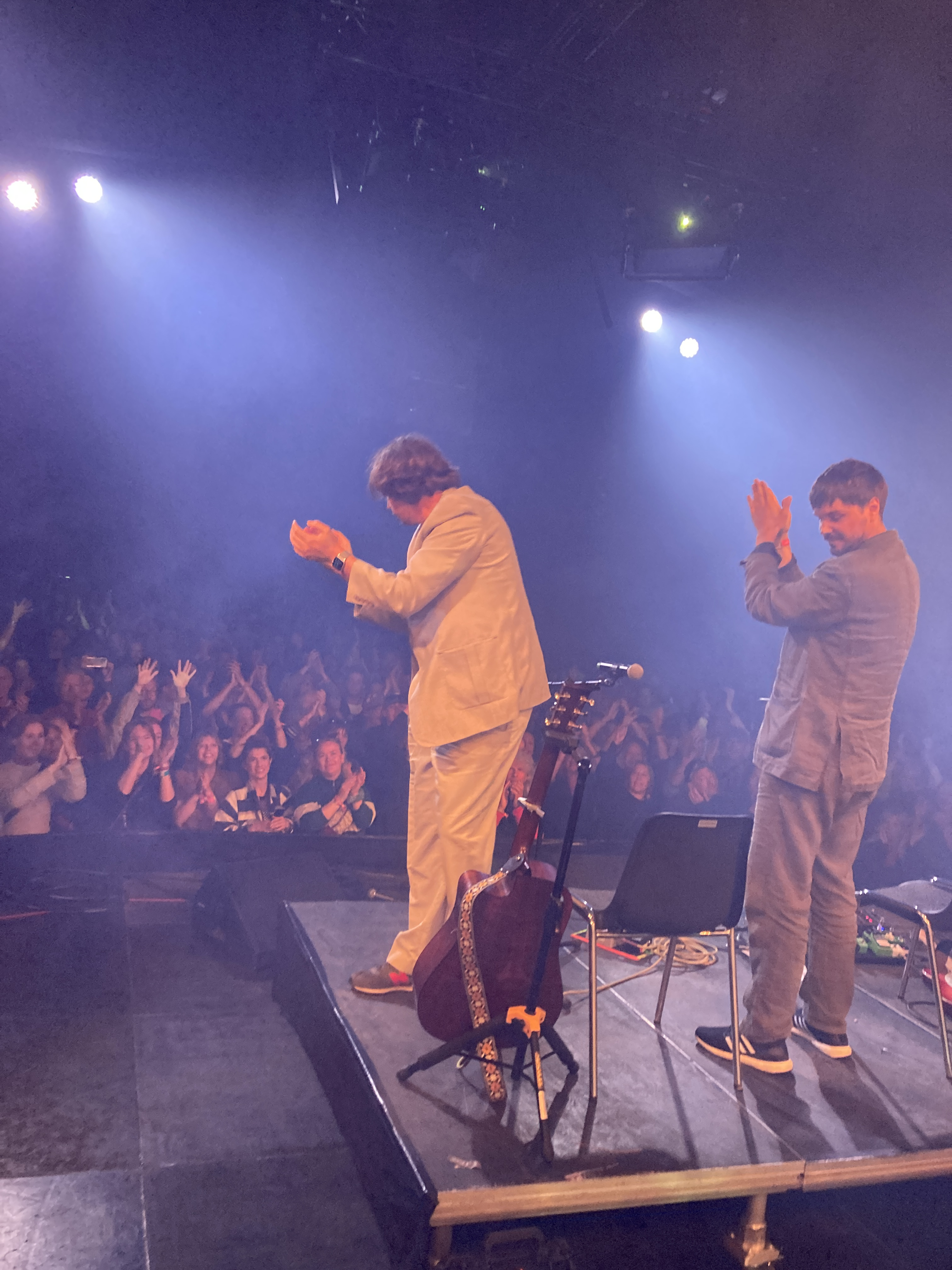
Söfelde on stage at Roskildefestivalen in 2023 together with Albin Lee Meldau

- Tilde – Pink Moon (2021), Vacanze Records
- Albin Lee Meldau – På svenska (In Swedish) (2020), Sony Music Entertainment Sweden AB
- Tilde – Call My Name (2020), Vacanze Records
- The Beautiful Swedes – Applications (2020), independent
- Albin Lee Meldau – About You (2019), Sony Music
- Tilde – Nothing Gold Can Stay (2018), Vacanze Records
- Various Artists – Så mycket bättre – Tolkningarna (2018), Sony Music Entertainment
- Various Artists – Christmas Rules Vol. 2 (2017), Capitol Records
- Albin Lee Meldau – Bloodshot – EP (2017), Sony Music Entertainment Sweden AB
- Ivanna – Leaving Town (2017), Bakery Allstars Recordings
- Albin Lee Meldau – Lovers – EP (2017), Sony Music Entertainment Sweden AB
- Ivanna – The Broadway Show (2016), Bakery Allstars Recordings

== Awards and recognitions ==
- Carin Malmlöf-Forsslings Composers Prize 2026
- Christ Johnson Prize 2025 Awardee. Appointed by the Royal Swedish Academy of Music, presented by His Majesty the King for the orchestral work Fugato.
- First Prize, Fidelio Piano Composition Competition (2023)
- Third Prize, She Lives Budapest Prize International Composition Competition (2023)
- STIM Grant Recipient (2018, 2021)
- Runner-up International Acoustic Music Awards (Alternative)
