= David Morgan (sociologist) =

British sociologist (1937–2020)

- Born: 30 July 1937
- Died: 17 June 2020 (aged 82)
- Scientific career
- Fields: Sociology
- Institutions: University of Manchester

David Hopcraft John Morgan (30 July 1937 – 17 June 2020), known as David (H. J.) Morgan, was a British sociologist, who was President of the British Sociological Association (1997–1999) and editor of the association's journal Sociology. His research focused on family sociology, gender studies and especially men's studies.

Morgan was Professor of Sociology at the University of Manchester, where he taught sociology from 1964, and where the Morgan Centre for the Study of Relationships and Personal Life is named in his honour. He also held Visiting Professorships at Keele University and the Norwegian University of Science and Technology. He was co-editor of the Palgrave Studies in Family Sociology book series.

He died on 17 June 2020, at the age of 82.

== Selected publications ==
- Morgan, D. H. J. (1975). Social theory and the family. London Boston: Routledge and Kegan Paul. ISBN 9780710081803.
- Morgan, D. H. J. (1985). The family, politics, and social theory. London Boston: Routledge & Kegan Paul. ISBN 9780710205223.
- Morgan, D. H. J.; Hearn, Jeff, eds. (1990). Men, masculinities & social theory. London Boston: Unwin Hyman. ISBN 9780044456582.
- Morgan, David H. J. (1992). Discovering men. London New York: Routledge. ISBN 9780415076227.
- Morgan, David H. J., ed. (1996). Family connections: an introduction to family studies. Cambridge, UK Cambridge, MA: Polity Press Blackwell Publishers. ISBN 9780745610795.
- Morgan, David; Brandth, Berit; Kvande, Elin, eds. (2005). Gender, bodies, and work. Aldershot, Hampshire, England Burlington, VT: Ashgate. ISBN 9780754644392.
- Morgan, David; Holdsworth, Clare, eds. (2005). Transitions in context: leaving home, independence and adulthood. Maidenhead, England New York: Open University Press. ISBN 9780335215386.
- Morgan, David (2009). Acquaintances: the space between intimates and strangers. Maidenhead: Open University Press. ISBN 9780335221608.

== See also ==
- Morgan Centre for the Study of Relationships and Personal Life, Arthur Lewis Building
- Professor Carol Smart, co-director of the Morgan Centre for the Study of Relationships and Personal Life
- Dame Janet Finch
- University of Manchester

Academic offices
Preceded by Stuart Hall	President of the British Sociological Association; 1997–1999	Succeeded by Sara Arber
