= Elna (name) =

- Gender: Female

Other names
- Related names: Helen, Elín

Elna is a feminine given name. Notable people with the name include:

- Elna Baker (born 1982), American writer and performer of humorous stories
- Elna Borch (1869–1950), Danish sculptor
- Elna Henrikson, Swedish figure skater
- Elna Jane Hilliard Grahn (1913–2006), American soldier
- Elna Kiljander (1889–1970), Finnish architect
- Elna Kimmestad (1918–1997), Norwegian actress
- Elna Lassen (1901–1930), Danish ballerina
- Elna Lillback (1906–1950), American dancer
- Elna Møller (1913–1994), Danish architect
- Elna Montgomery (1885–1981), Swedish figure skater
- Elna Munch (1871–1945), Danish feminist and politician
- Elna Reinach (1968), South African former pro tennis player
