= Nijman =

Dutch surname

Nijman is a Dutch surname. Among variant forms are Neijman, Neyman, Nieman(s), and Nyman. It originated as a nickname for either an unknown or nameless person, related to modern Dutch niemand ("nobody"), or for a newcomer to a place (modern Dutch nieuw man, cognate to English Newman and German Neumann. People with this surname include:

- Brigitte Nijman (born 1970), Duch musical actress, singer and voice actor
- Hans Nijman (1959–2014), Dutch mixed martial artist and professional wrestler.
- Jan Willem Nijman (born 1990s), Dutch video game developer
- Jerry Nijman (born 1966), Suriname-born Dutch boxer
- Marijn Nijman (born 1985), Dutch cricketer, sister of Ruud
- Max Nijman (1941–2016), Surinamese singer
- Ruud Nijman (born 1982), Dutch cricketer, brother of Marijn
- Yosh Nijman (born 1996), American football player
