= Nyman =

Nyman is an English and Swedish surname. The name originates from Anglo-Saxon culture. The name is derived from the words neowe, niwe, and nige which all mean new, and the word mann, meaning man. The name was traditionally given to newcomers. Other variations of the surname include: Newman, Newmen, and Newmin. People with this surname include:

- Andy Nyman (born 1966), British actor
- Anita Nyman (born 1971), Finnish cross country skier
- Ari Nyman (born 1984), Finnish footballer
- Carl Fredrik Nyman (1820–1893), Swedish botanist
- Carl R. Nyman (1895–1983), American politician
- Chris Nyman (born 1955), American baseball player
- Christina Nyman (1719–1795), Swedish brewer
- Elin Nyman (born 1991), Swedish footballer
- Gustaf Nyman (1874–1952), Finnish sport shooter
- Jani Nyman (born 2004), Finnish ice hockey player
- Joni Nyman (born 1962), Finnish boxer, Olympic contestant
- John Nyman (1908–1977), Swedish wrestler
- Lena Nyman (1944–2011), Swedish actress
- Marcus Nyman (born 1990), Swedish judoka
- Mark Nyman (born 1967), English championship Scrabble player
- Michael Nyman (born 1944), British composer and musicologist
- Molly Nyman British composer, daughter of Michael Nyman
- Nyls Nyman (born 1954), American baseball player
- Peter Nyman (born 1965), Finnish journalist and TV reporter
- Rhonda Nyman American politician
- Robert Nyman American politician
- Steven Nyman (born 1982), American alpine skier, Olympic contestant

== See also ==
- Nijman, Dutch surname spelled Nyman abroad
