= John Eekelaar =

South African legal scholar (born 1942)

John Eekelaar FBA
- Born: 2 July 1942 (age 83)
- Known for: Family Law, Constitutional Law, Socio-Legal Studies, Jurisprudence
- Scientific career
- Fields: Family law
- Institutions: Oxford Centre for Family Law and Policy (OXFLAP), University of Oxford

John Eekelaar FBA (born 2 July 1942) is a South African-born legal scholar who specialised in family law during his academic career at the University of Oxford. A Rhodes Scholar and recipient of the Vinerian Scholarship, he served as a Tutorial Fellow at Pembroke College from 1965 and as Reader in Law from 1991 until his retirement from teaching in 2005. Elected a Fellow of the British Academy in 2001, he has served as editor of the International Journal of Law, Policy and the Family and the Oxford Journal of Legal Studies. After his retirement, he served as the academic director of Pembroke College (2005–2009) and became co-director of the Oxford Centre for Family Law and Policy (OXFLAP).

== Biography ==
Eekelaar was born in Johannesburg, South Africa, and earned his LL.B. from King's College London in 1963, and gained his BCL and MA from University College, Oxford in 1965 and 1967 respectively.

Eekelaar held a Rhodes Scholarship from 1963 to 1965, and was awarded the Vinerian Scholarship in 1965. He was called to the Bar in 1968 at the Inner Temple. Eekelaar has been a Tutorial Fellow at Pembroke College since 1965; he held a CUF Lecturership from 1966 to 1991, and has been Reader in Law since 1991. He was elected to a Fellowship of the British Academy in July 2001.

Eekelaar has been editor of the International Journal of Law, Policy and the Family and the Oxford Journal of Legal Studies.

== Bibliography ==
=== Books ===
- Katz, Sanford N.; Eekelaar, John; Maclean, Mavis (2000). Cross currents: family law and policy in the United States and England. Oxford: Oxford University Press. ISBN 9780198299448.
- Eekelaar, John; Maclean, Mavis; Beinart, Sarah (2000). Family lawyers: the divorce work of solicitors. Oxford: Hart. ISBN 9781841131856.
- Eekelaar, John; Maclean, Mavis (2004). Personal Relationships, Marriage and Morals. Oxford: Oxford Centre for Family Law and Policy (OXFLAP) working paper, Department of Social Policy and Social Work. ISBN 9780954170356.

=== Journals ===
- Maclean, Mavis; Eekelaar, John (December 2004). "Marriage and the moral bases of personal relationships". Journal of Law and Society. 31 (4): 510–539. doi:10.1111/j.1467-6478.2004.00301.x. ISSN 0263-323X. JSTOR 1410653.
- Maclean, Mavis; Eekelaar, John (2004). "The obligations and expectation of couples within families; three modes of interaction". Journal of Social Welfare and Family Law. 26 (2): 117–130. doi:10.1080/0141803042000236060. S2CID 144993728.
- Eekelaar, John; Maclean, Mavis (July 2005). "The significance of marriage: contrasts between white British and ethnic minority groups in England". Law & Policy. 27 (3): 379–398. doi:10.1111/j.1467-9930.2005.00204.x.
- Eekelaar, John (January 2005). "Shared income after divorce: a step too far". Law Quarterly Review. 121: 1–4. ISSN 0023-933X.
- Eekelaar, John (August 2004). "Children between cultures". International Journal of Law, Policy and the Family. 18 (2): 178–194. doi:10.1093/lawfam/18.2.178.

=== Book chapters ===
- Maclean, Mavis (2000), "Access to justice for families in post war Britain.", in Katz, Sanford N.; Eekelaar, John; Maclean, Mavis (eds.), Cross currents: family law and policy in the United States and England, Oxford: Oxford University Press, pp. 363–387, ISBN 9780198299448

== See also ==
- Child custody
- Divorce
- Family law
  - Parental rights
- Paternity (law)
- Residence (ENG)
- Professor Carol Smart
- Mavis Maclean
