= Mavis Maclean =

British legal scholar (born 1943)

Mavis Maclean CBE FRSA
- Born: 31 December 1943 (age 82)
- Known for: Socio-legal research
- Scientific career
- Fields: Family law
- Workplaces: Oxford Centre for Family Law and Policy (OXFLAP), University of Oxford
- Website: Official website

Mavis Maclean, CBE, FRSA, FAcSS (born 31 December 1943) is a British legal scholar. She has carried out socio-legal research at the University of Oxford since 1974, and in 2001 founded the Oxford Centre for Family Law and Policy (OXFLAP).

In 1993 she was elected President of the Research Committee for the Sociology of Law, International Sociological Association, in 2000 a Trustee of the Law and Society Association. Maclean is also a Fellow of the Royal Society of Arts and the ESRC Research College SHARe. In 2011 she was the inaugural recipient of the Socio-Legal Studies Association's Prize for Contributions to the Socio-Legal Community.

== Bibliography ==
=== Books ===
- Katz, Sanford N.; Eekelaar, John; Maclean, Mavis (2000). Cross currents: family law and policy in the United States and England. Oxford: Oxford University Press. ISBN 9780198299448.
- Eekelaar, John; Maclean, Mavis; Beinart, Sarah (2000). Family lawyers: the divorce work of solicitors. Oxford: Hart. ISBN 9781841131856.
- Maclean, Mavis (2000). Making law for families. Oñati International Institute for the Sociology of Law. Portland, OR Oxford: Hart. ISBN 9781841132051.
- Eekelaar, John; Maclean, Mavis (2004). Personal Relationships, Marriage and Morals. Oxford: Oxford Centre for Family Law and Policy (OXFLAP) working paper, Department of Social Policy and Social Work. ISBN 9780954170356.
- Maclean, Mavis Ed. (2005). Family law and family values. Oxford Portland, Oregon: Hart Publishing Ltd. pp. 137–153. ISBN 9781841135489.
- Maclean, Mavis Ed. (2007). Parenting after partnering : containing conflict after separation. Oxford Portland, Oregon: Hart Publishing. pp. 65–80. ISBN 9781841137827.

=== Journals ===
- Maclean, Mavis (2001). "Doctors, parents and the law-organ retention after paediatric cardiac surgery at the Bristol royal Infirmary Inquiry". Child and Family Law Quarterly. 13 (4). Social science research network: 399–404. SSRN 2089467.
- Maclean, Mavis (4 December 2001). "How does an inquiry inquire? a brief note on the working methods of the Bristol Royal Infirmary Inquiry". Journal of Law and Society. 28 (4): 590–601. doi:10.1111/1467-6478.00204. JSTOR 3657962.
- Maclean, Mavis; Eekelaar, John (December 2004). "Marriage and the moral bases of personal relationships". Journal of Law and Society. 31 (4): 510–539. doi:10.1111/j.1467-6478.2004.00301.x. ISSN 0263-323X. JSTOR 1410653.
- Maclean, Mavis; Eekelaar, John (2004). "The obligations and expectation of couples within families; three modes of interaction". Journal of Social Welfare and Family Law. 26 (2): 117–130. doi:10.1080/0141803042000236060. S2CID 144993728.
- Maclean, Mavis (2005). "Parenthood should not be regarded as a right". Archives of Disease in Childhood. 90 (8): 782–783. doi:10.1136/adc.2004.064493. PMC 1720506. PMID 16040871.
- Maclean, Mavis; Eekelaar, John (July 2005). "The significance of marriage: contrasts between white British and ethnic minority groups in England". Law & Policy. 27 (3): 379–398. doi:10.1111/j.1467-9930.2005.00204.x.

=== Book chapters ===
- Maclean, Mavis; Warman, Andrea (2000), "A comparative approach to child support systems: legal rules and social policies", in Oldham, J. Thomas; Melli, Marygold S. (eds.), Child support: the next frontier, Ann Arbor: University of Michigan Press, pp. 166–179, ISBN 9780472110575
- Maclean, Mavis (2000), "Access to justice for families in post war Britain.", in Katz, Sanford N.; Eekelaar, John; Maclean, Mavis (eds.), Cross currents: family law and policy in the United States and England, Oxford: Oxford University Press, pp. 363–387, ISBN 9780198299448

== See also ==
- Child custody
- Divorce
- Family law
- Parental rights
- Paternity (law)
- Professor Carol Smart
- John Eekelaar
