= Susan Braun =

- Born: July 24, 1916; New York City, United States
- Died: October 3, 1995 (aged 79); New York City, United States
- Occupations: Arts administrator, filmmaker, archivist
- Known for: Founder of Dance Films Association

Susan Braun (July 24, 1916 – October 3, 1995) was an American arts administrator, filmmaker and archivist. She founded the Dance Films Association (DFA) in New York City. Braun later also launched the annual Dance on Camera Festival.

== Early life and education ==
Braun was born in New York City to Alfred and Georgina (Ballin) Braun on 24 July 1916. She trained first as a visual artist, studying illustration at Parsons School of Design and painting at the Art Students League of New York before turning decisively to dance. Between 1949 and 1953 she studied the Isadora Duncan technique with Anita Zahn.

== Career ==
Braun joined as a volunteer programme assistant at the Museum of Modern Art’s circulating film library. Frustrated by the scarcity of dance titles, she began personally tracking down prints, borrowing a 16 mm projector and showing films to dancers and students in loft spaces across Manhattan. These informal screenings encouraged her to incorporate Dance Films Association in 1959 as a non-profit “clearing-house” for choreographers, educators and scholars.

In 1971, Braun inaugurated the Dance on Camera Festival, first at the American Museum of Natural History, then at the New York Public Library’s Donnell Media Center and, from 1996, in partnership with Film at Lincoln Center.

Braun managed DFA single-handedly, programming, fundraising and even tearing tickets, until her health declined in the early 1990s. Upon her death on 3 October 1995, she bequeathed a US$500,000 trust to sustain the organisation.

== Honors ==
DFA created the Susan Braun Award in 1996, presented annually to artists whose work advances dance film; the first recipient was filmmaker-choreographer Yvonne Rainer.
