= Elna Lillback =

American dance educator

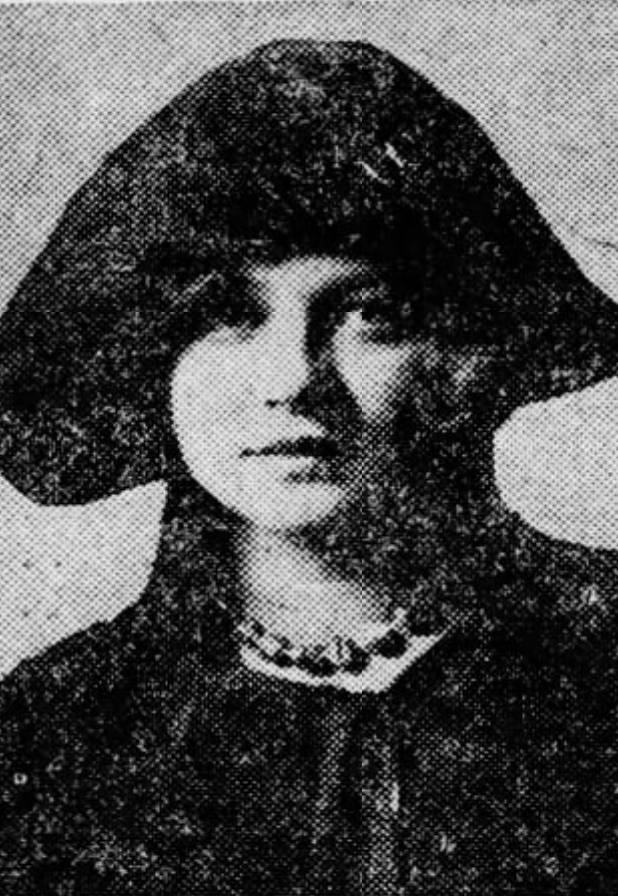
- Elna Lillback, from a 1925 newspaper
- Born: 1906; Fitchburg, Massachusetts, U.S.
- Died: January 16, 1950 (aged 43–44); Brooklyn, New York, U.S.
- Other names: Elna Lillback Addison, Elna Lillback Kline
- Occupations: dancer, dance educator, college professor
- Spouse: Arthur Addison Kline

Elna Theresa Lillback Addison (1906 – January 16, 1950), also known as Elna Lillback Kline, was an American dancer, choreographer, and college professor. She taught at Brooklyn College in the 1930s and 1940s.

== Early life and education ==
Lillback was born in Fitchburg, Massachusetts, a daughter of John Erik Lillback and Frances Theresa (Fanny) Mattson Lillback. Her father was a Congregational pastor, born in Finland. She graduated from Hunter College in 1927. She studied in Germany with Mary Wigman and in New York with Martha Graham.

== Career ==
Lillback and her dance company gave their New York debut recital in 1935, at the Guild Theatre; she was accompanied by pianist and composer Norman Lloyd. Critic John Martin of The New York Times observed the influences of Wigman and Graham. She gave another recital at the Guild Theatre in 1936, which John Martin called "manifestly over-ambitious", while admitting that Lillback had "grown considerably in poise and assurance since last year". Another Guild Theatre appearance in 1937 was panned as "a program of excessive dullness" by Virginia Mishnun in the Brooklyn Eagle. She gave a benefit dance performance at the Barbizon Plaza in 1939, to raise scholarship funds for Brooklyn College.

In the 1930s and 1940s, Lillback taught physiology and hygiene at Brooklyn College, where she organized the dance department in 1931, and directed the college's Modern Dance Club in several performances a year.

== Publications ==
- "Approach to Dance Composition" (1941)
- "Approach to Dance Composition: II" (1941)

== Personal life ==
Lillback married Arthur Addison (also known as Arthur Addison Kline) in 1932. They had a daughter, Joan. Lillback died in 1950, at the age of 43, in Brooklyn.
