= Arthur Lewis Building =

University building at the University of Manchester

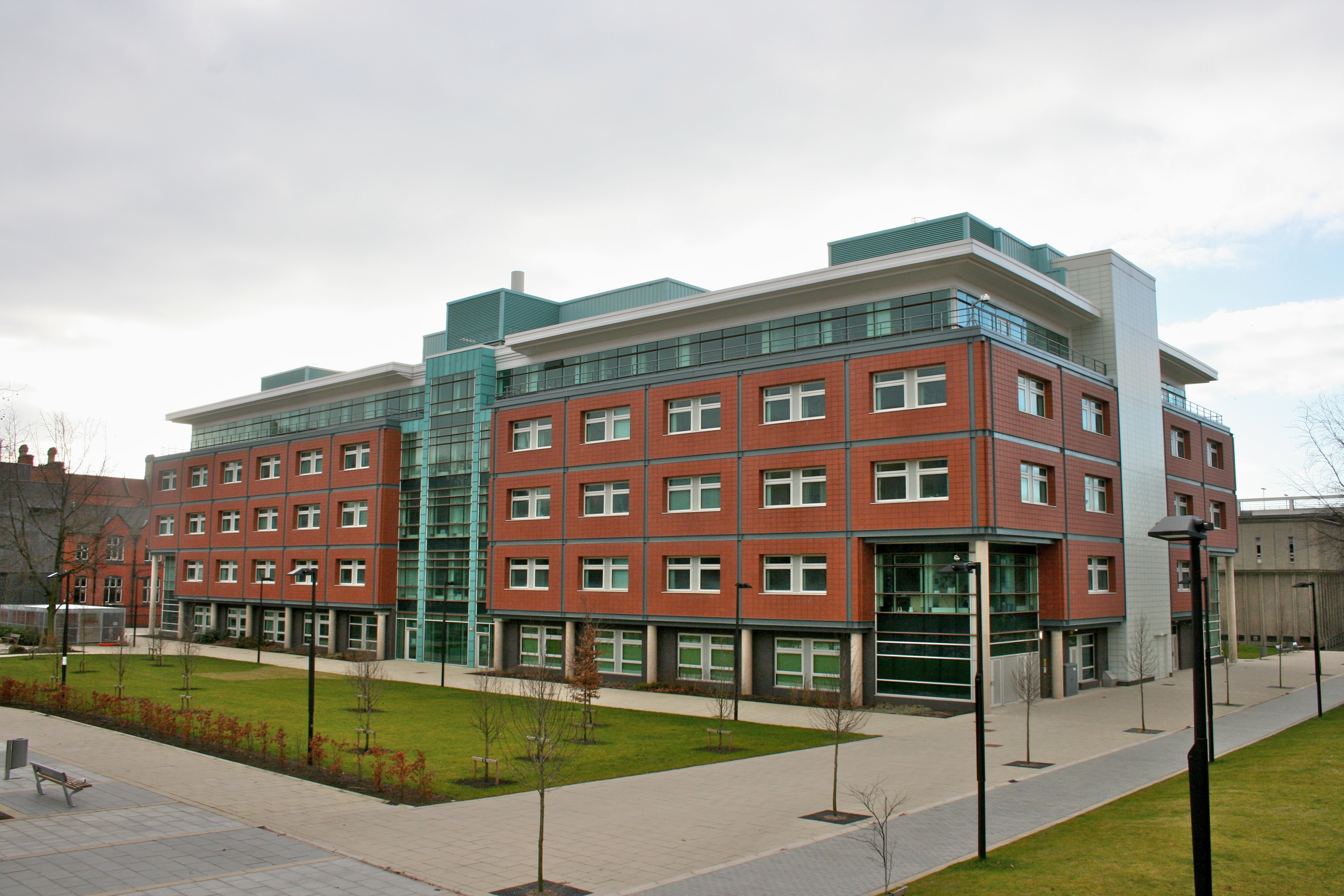
- The Arthur Lewis Building
- Interactive map of the Arthur Lewis Building area

General information
- Type: Academic
- Location: Manchester
- Coordinates: 53°28′1.56″N 2°14′8.88″W
- Construction started: 2006
- Completed: 2007
- Owner: The University of Manchester

Design and construction
- Architect: The Fairhursts Design Group
- Structural engineer: Buro Happold
- Services engineer: DSSR
- Quantity surveyor: Capita
- Main contractor: AMEC

The Arthur Lewis Building, which is named after the economist Arthur Lewis, is part of the University of Manchester's campus. It is located west of Oxford Road and south of the Manchester Business School, nearly a mile from the centre of Manchester, UK. Construction was completed in 2007, when the building was given a BREEAM 'Very Good' rating.

== Controversies ==
In early 2008 the building was at the centre of controversy regarding access by students to members of the academic staff accommodated within due to its swipe card policy. This system required taught students to either email their relevant tutor before meeting them, call them internally once at the building, or book an appointment online. In May 2008 the two schools in the building separately revised their access policies to ease access.

== Floor-by-floor guide ==
The building is shared by the School of Social Sciences (SoSS) and the School of Environment, Education and Development (SEED).

Floor	Offices
Ground floor	SoSS Undergraduate Admissions Office; SoSS Undergraduate Support Office; Shared teaching rooms; SoSS Granada Centre for Visual Anthropology library, edit suite, viewing room and technician; Shared PGT study suites and Resources Centre; SEED laboratories; Staff showers; Arthur's Brew Café; SoSS Head of School and Head of School Administration
First floor	SEED - Geography, Institute for Development Policy and Management and Planning and Landscape academic staff
Second floor	SoSS Administration and Resources Suite (Research Office, Finance Office, Resources Office); SoSS Postgraduate Admissions Office; SoSS Postgraduate Support Office; SoSS Social Anthropology; SoSS Economics; SEED Student Information; SEED Administration
Third floor	SoSS – Economics; SoSS – Sociology; SoSS – Morgan Centre
Fourth floor	SoSS – Philosophy; SoSS – Politics

== See also ==
- University of Manchester
- Professor Carol Smart, co-director of the Morgan Centre for the Study of Relationships and Personal Life
- David Morgan (the sociologist that the Morgan Centre is named after)
- Professor Rane Willerslev, former associate professor at the Granada Centre for Visual Anthropology
