= Rane Willerslev =

Danish anthropologist

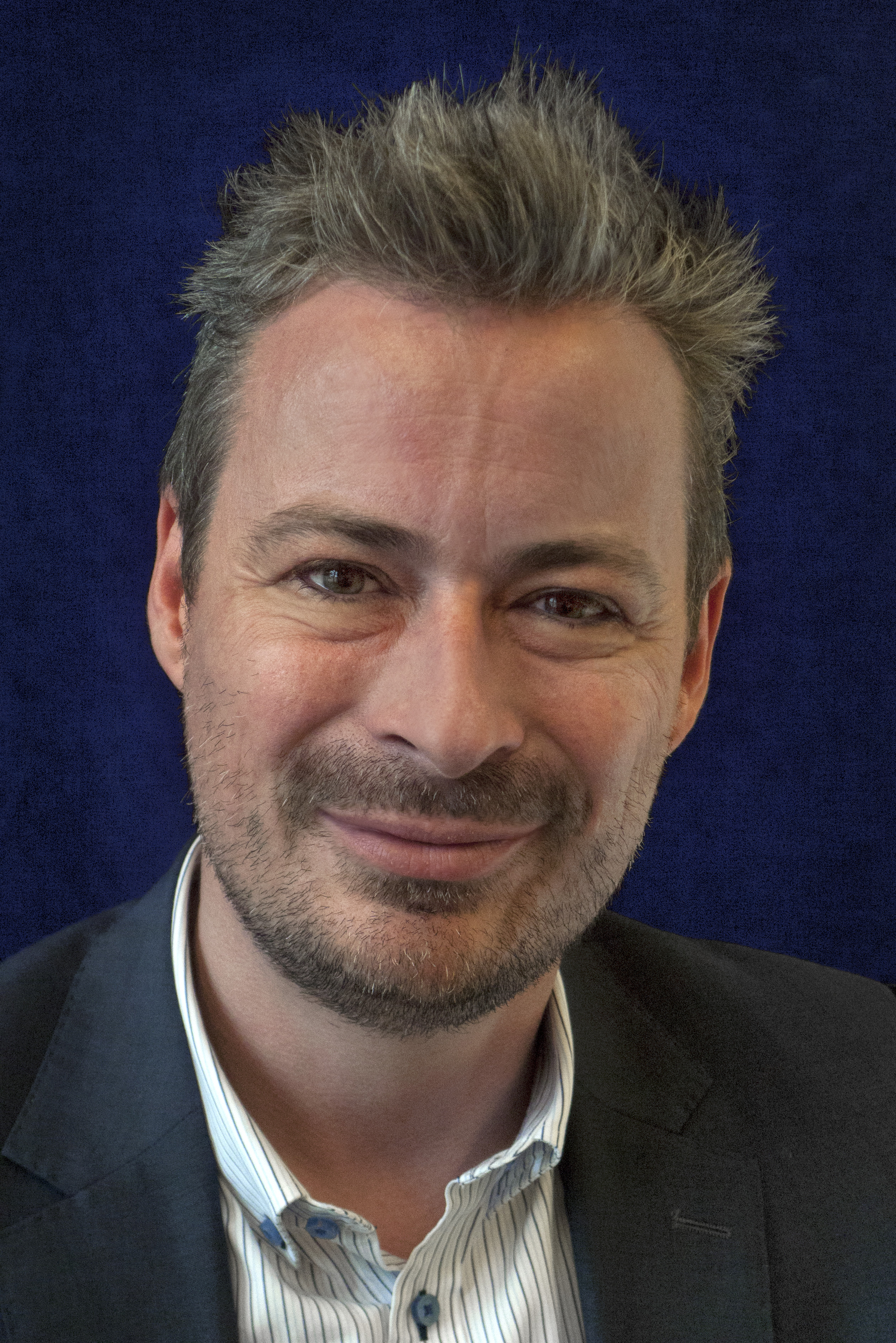

Director of the National Museum of Denmark
- Incumbent
- Assumed office 1 July 2017
- Preceded by: Per Kristian Madsen

Personal details
- Born: 5 June 1971 Gentofte, Denmark
- Relatives: Eske Willerslev (brother)
- Scientific career
- Known for: Professor of Anthropology
- Fields: Anthropology
- Institutions: University of Manchester, Museum of Cultural History, University of Oslo

Rane Willerslev is a Danish anthropologist. In his academic career, he has travelled extensively and has a particular interest in tribal cultures, both present and prehistoric. On 1 July 2017, he was appointed director of the National Museum of Denmark by Culture Minister Mette Bock.

In Denmark, Willerslev is a popular media personality, engaging in TV and radio shows, public panel debates, and interviews relating to his academic interests and his opinions on society and education at large. He has written and co-authored several books, including academic, fictional and biographic works.

== Early life and education ==
Willerslev was born in Gentofte north of Copenhagen as the son of the historian Richard Willerslev and teacher Lona Loell Willerslev. His identical twin brother, a noted evolutionary biologist, is Eske Willerslev. He attended Ordrup Gymnasium. He studied at the University of Manchester where he was awarded a Master of Arts degree in Visual Anthropology in 1996. His 2003 PhD degree was from the University of Cambridge. Willerslev's main field of research has been hunting and spiritual knowledge of the indigenous peoples of Siberia, amongst whom he lived, first with his twin, and later alone for three years.

== Career ==
From 2004 to 2006, Willerslev was associate professor at the Granada Centre for Visual Anthropology in the Department for Social Anthropology at the University of Manchester. In 2006 he returned to Denmark to assume a position as director of the Ethnographic Collections at Moesgård Museum and was also appointed an associate professor at the University of Aarhus, In 2010, he was given a full professorship.

From September 2011 to September 2013, he was the director of the Museum of Cultural History at the University of Oslo. He then returned to Aarhus where he led the arctic research area at the Institute for Anthropology, Archaeology and Linguistics.

On 1 July 2017, Rane Willerslev, took position as CEO of the National Museum Of Denmark. Willerslev was appointed to the position by the Danish Minister Of Culture at the time, Mette Bock, chiefly due to his previous merits as CEO of the Cultural History Museum Of Norway. In order to generate public interest for the National Museum Of Denmark, Rane Willerslev appeared in a series of TV-programs titled 'Ranes Museum' aired in late 2017 and beginning of 2018 on the Danish National Broadcasting Channel. The continuous TV-appearances made Willerslev publicly well known in Denmark for his humorous character and statements which i.a. entailed his preferences for Siberian wilderness clothing as opposed to wearing a suit to the office. In a statement regarding the National Museum Of Denmark's fashion historical exhibition in 2018, Willerslev, in a witty fashion, again proclaimed his preferences for the wilderness outfits and for 1980s fashion: ″The 1980s must have been a period of great human tolerance seeing as something as ugly as 80s fashion was in existence and accepted.″

In the academic world, Willerslev is somewhat controversial in his approach to anthropology and scientific thought at large. Inspired by personal experiences, in particular from his stay in Siberia, he believes that animism and spirituality is an overlooked and wrongfully frowned upon concept in academia.

== Publications ==
The author of several scientific articles, chapters in books and newspaper articles, including contributions on vision and visiology, animism, phenomenology and other anthropological topics, he has also brought out books: Hunting and Trapping in Siberia, which appeared in 2000 (Arctic Information); Soul Hunters: Hunting, Animism and Personhood among the Siberian Yukaghirs, published in 2007 (University of California Press), and On the Run in Siberia, published in 2012 (University of Minnesota Press). Since 2009, Willerslev has been the editor of Acta Borealia: Nordic Journal of Circumpolar Societies. He is also the editor (with Dorthe Refslund Christensen) of the book, Taming Time, Timing Death, published in 2012 (Asgate) and (with Christian Suhr) Transcultural Montage, published in 2013 (Berghahn).

Both in 2006 and 2010, Willerslev was awarded the ‘Elite Researcher’s Awards’ by the Independent Research Councils of Denmark. In 2010, Willerslev gave the Malinowski Memorial Lecture at London School of Economics.

Books:

- Rane Willerslev (2007): "Soul Hunters: Hunting, Animism, and Personhood among the Siberian Yukaghirs", Berkeley, CA: University of California Press.
- Rane Willerslev (2012): "On the Run in Siberia", University Of Minnesota Press.
- "Taming Time, Timing Death", Edited by Rane Willerslev and Dorthe Refslund Christensen (2016), Studies in Death, Materiality and Time (Vol. 1), Taylor And Francis.
- Rane Willerslev (2017): "Tænk vildt", People'sPress (in Danish)
- Willerslev, Nørretranders & Brinkmann (2018): "Strejf", People´sPress (in Danish). A debate about the current transition between the analogue and digital.
