= Elin Johansson =

Elin Johansson may refer to:

- Elin Johansson (taekwondo) (born 1990), Swedish taekwondo athlete
- Elin Johansson (footballer) (born 1992), Swedish football midfielder
