= Vojakkala =

Vojakkala Nedre Vojakkala
- Smaller locality
- Location within Norrbotten Location within Sweden
- Coordinates: 65°55′3″N 24°5′43″E
- Country: Sweden
- County: Norrbotten
- Municipality: Haparanda

Area
  - Total: 0.16 km^{2} (0.062 sq mi)

Population (2010)
  - Total: 62
- Time zone: UTC+1 (CET)
  - Summer (DST): UTC+2 (CEST)
- Postal code: 953 xx

Vojakkala is a smaller locality with about 62 inhabitants in Haparanda Municipality, Norrbotten County, Sweden, known for a long-standing feud between neighbors.

== Local feud ==
The community has gained attention from an infamous, long-lasting neighbor feud between a family of Romani descent and several neighbors since 1984. The feud has resulted in several hundred police reports and two convictions for attempted murder, the latest of which occurred in 2008.

The events have been documented by popular TV shows Insider and Uppdrag granskning in April 2007 and September 3, 2008, respectively. Earlier events have been documented by local and national newspapers and TV channels since mid-late 1980 and Swedish government have made efforts to solve the feud. The media focus has been on the Romani family as the main perpetrators.

In 2009, a renowned investigative journalist has implied that the situation has been aggravated by the grave anti-Romani sentiments of the local community and that they have played a great part in the conflict. He speculates that the family, to a greater extent than initiating harassment against the local community, has been the victim of prejudice and racism. However, in 2009, the Supreme Court of Sweden did not see any reason to overturn the ruling of the Appeals Court, which sentenced six persons to prison in connection with the attempted murder in 2008, which involved grave battery to the head of a neighbor using an axe. (The victim was later shot to death in 2012, in an unrelated incident.).

== Notable residents ==
- Elin Pikkuniemi, cross-country skier
