= Berit Brandth =

Norwegian sociologist and gender researcher

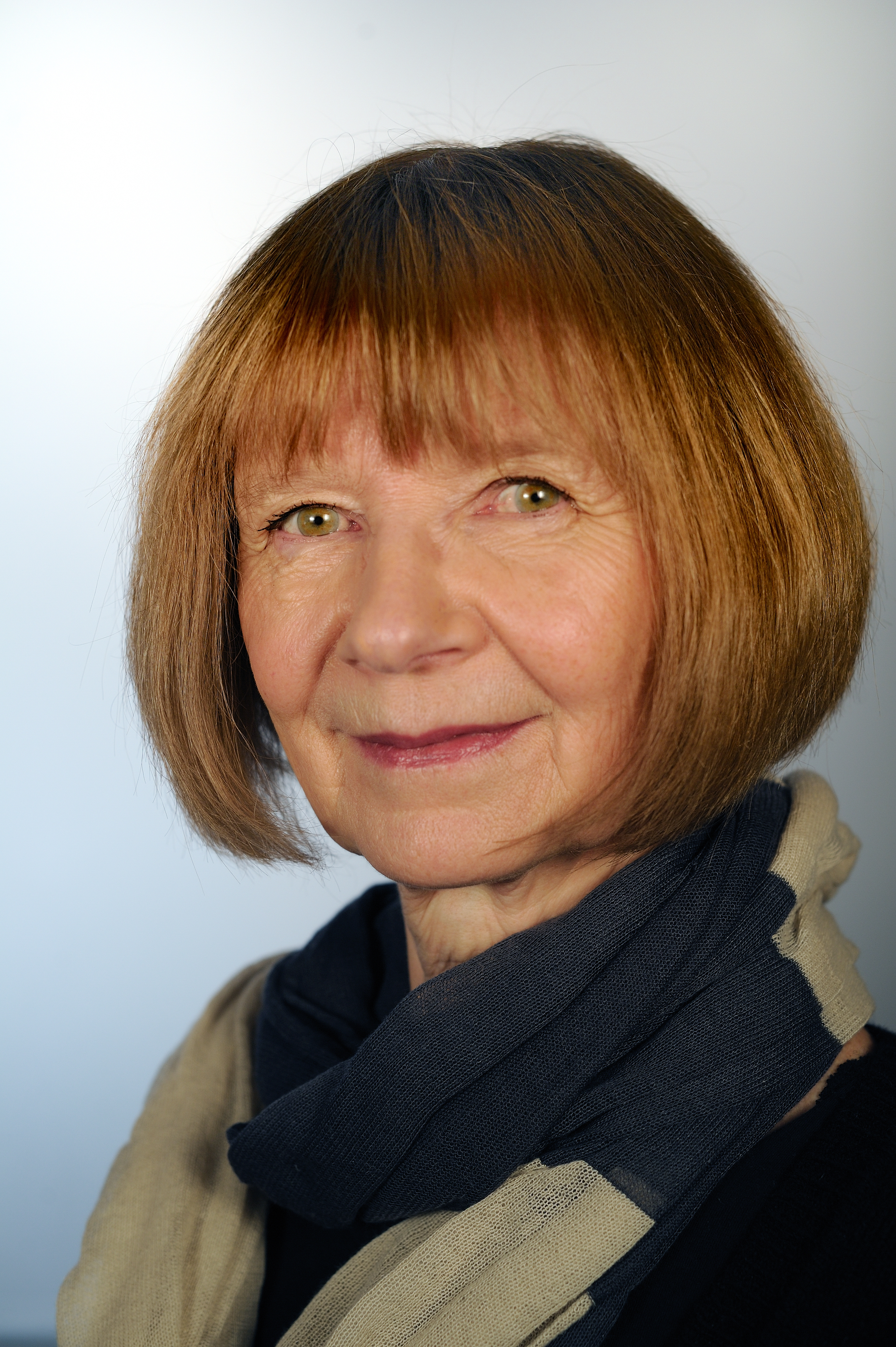
Berit Brandth (2011)

Berit Brandth (born 1 June 1947) is a Norwegian sociologist and gender researcher.

== Biography ==
Brandth is a graduate of Bates College in the US and the University of Trondheim (now integrated into NTNU), where she took a major in 1977. She is a professor of sociology at NTNU and a research advisor at the Norwegian Center for Rural Research. She has focused on both masculinity and femininity, with perspectives from work, technology, media and organization. One of Brandth's research themes is gender in agriculture, in relation to farm tourism and management in agricultural organizations. She has also researched the development and use of the maternity/paternity leave of absence, with particular emphasis on fathers' rights. In 2014, she was appointed as a member of the Working Time Committee, which looked at how we can best utilize the labor force in the future.

== Selected works ==
- 2015 - Feminism and Ruralities, with Barbara Pini (Plagiarist) and Jo Little. Lexington Books. ISBN 9780739188217
- 2013 - Fedrekvoten og den farsvennlige velferdsstaten (editor and contributor), with Elin Kvande. Universitetsforlaget. ISBN 9788215021898
- 2010 - Föräldraledighet, omsorgspolitik och jämställdhet i Norden, with Gudny Bjørk Eydal, Ingolfur V. Gislason, Ann-Zofie Duvander, Johanna Lammi-Taskula, Tine Rostgaard
- 2005 - Gender, Bodies and Work (editor and contributor), with David Morgan and Elin Kvande. Ashgate. ISBN 9780754644392
- 2005 - Valgfrihetens tid, omsorgspolitikk for barn i det fleksible arbeidsliv (editor and contributor), with Brita Bungum and Elin Kvande
- 2003 - Fleksible fedre. Arbeid-Maskulinitet-Velferdsstat, with Elin Kvande. Universitetsforlaget. ISBN 9788215001005
- 1999 - Familie for tiden, with Kari Moxnes. Universitetsforlaget. ISBN 9788251834797
