= Janet Finch =

British sociologist and academic administrator

Dame Janet Finch DBE DL AcSS
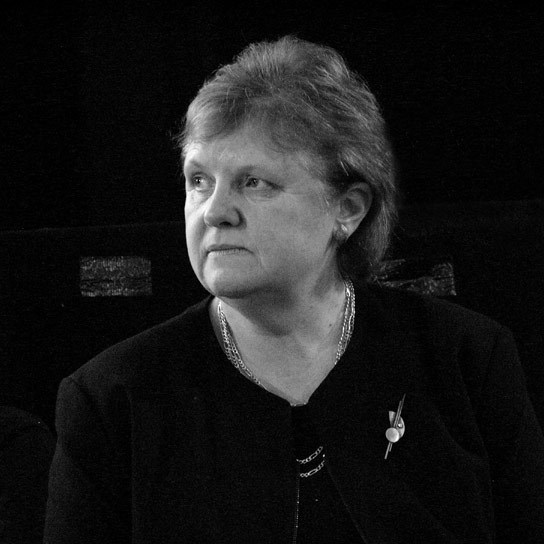
- Janet Finch speaking at Keele University Students' Union, November 2003.
- Born: Janet Valerie Finch; 13 February 1946 (age 80)
- Occupations: British sociologist, academic and educational administrator

Dame Janet Valerie Finch DBE, DL, FAcSS (born 13 February 1946) is a British sociologist and academic administrator. She was Vice-Chancellor and Professor of Social Relations at Keele University, and has held a number of other public appointments in the UK. She currently holds an honorary position at the Morgan Centre for the Study of Relationships and Personal Life, based in the School of Social Sciences, University of Manchester. She is also part of Flooved advisory board.

== Biography ==
Finch was educated at Merchant Taylors' Girls' School, Crosby, Merseyside, and then Bedford College, London (now merged with Royal Holloway College, London (RHC)) where she obtained BA in sociology. She obtained a PhD in sociology from the University of Bradford in 1975. She was made an Honorary Fellow of RHC in 1999.

Finch has published extensively on family relationships, her research interests focusing especially on inter-generational family relationships. In September 1995, Finch was appointed Vice-Chancellor at Keele University, having previously been a Pro-Vice-Chancellor at Lancaster University.

At Keele, she has overseen substantial alterations of the university and the increasing development of a private Science and Business Park. She attracted controversy in February 2007, when it was announced that she would receive a pay raise of 31.7%, the largest raise for any Vice-Chancellor in England that year.

In a statement given to the THES, the university responded that the salary awarded would be frozen for a three-year term, and was awarded following comparisons with other institutions, and taking into account Finch's "outstanding performance during a period of cultural and procedural change and development". She retired from her position in 2010, having served fifteen years as Keele's Vice-Chancellor. She returned the following year to be made a Doctor of Letters.

Finch is one of four main panel chairs in the Research Excellence Framework, based at the University of Manchester, a non-executive director of the Identity and Passport Service and the chair of the Council of Ombudsman Service Ltd. In 2011 the government selected Finch to be the chair of the UK Statistics Authority, but during a pre-appointment hearing with MPs on the Public Administration Select Committee differences became apparent on how the independence of the chair should be exercised, and Finch decided to withdraw from the application process. In 2012-13 Finch chaired the government's Working Group on Expanding Access to Published Research Findings, which produced a report recommending a policy direction for open access. She was independent co-chair of the Council for Science and Technology.

== Honours ==
Janet Finch was named a CBE in the 1999 New Year's Honours List for services to social science, and a DBE in the 2008 Birthday Honours List, for services to social science and higher education.

== Selected works ==
- Married to the Job: Wives' Incorporation in Men's Work (Allen and Unwin, 1983)
- Education as Social Policy (Longman, 1984)
- Research and Policy: the Uses of Qualitative Methods in Social and Educational Research (Falmer Press, 1986)
- Family Obligations and Social Change (Polity Press, 1989)
- Negotiating Family Responsibilities (with J Mason; Routledge, 1993)
- Wills, Inheritance and Families (with L Hayes, J Mason and L Wallis; Polity Press, 1996)
- Passing On: Kinship and Inheritance in England (with J Mason; Routledge, 2000)

== See also ==
- Carol Smart
- David Morgan (sociologist)
- Keele University
- University of Manchester

Academic offices
Preceded by Professor Sir Brian Fender	Vice-Chancellor, Keele University; 1995–2010	Succeeded by Professor Nick Foskett
