= Virginia Mishnun =

American writer (1909–2003)

- Born: March 6, 1909; New York, New York, U.S.
- Died: June 23, 2003 (aged 94); Gloucester, Massachusetts, U.S.
- Other names: Virginia Mishnun Margolin, Virginia Mishnun Hardman
- Occupations: Writer, arts critic, poet
- Spouse: J. B. S. Hardman

Virginia Mishnun Hardman (March 6, 1909 – June 23, 2003) was an American writer, poet, and arts critic. She was dance critic at the Brooklyn Eagle in the 1930s, worked at the United States Bureau of Indian Affairs in the 1940s, and published two books of poetry.

== Early life and education ==
Mishnun was born in New York, the daughter of Solomon Mishnun and Helen Mishnun. Both of her parents were Jewish immigrants from Eastern Europe. She graduated from Hunter College in 1936, and won the Helen Gray Cone Fellowship for graduate studies in English literature and criticism at Columbia University. She earned a master's degree at Columbia in 1937, with a master's essay titled "The concept of imitation in English literary criticism from Dryden to Young".

== Career ==
Mishnun began writing poetry in childhood; one of her early poems, "The Moon", was published in a 1927 anthology of poetry by children. She performed as a modern dancer during college, and with the American Laboratory Theatre. She directed the Workers' Dance Theatre. She wrote dance criticism for the Brooklyn Eagle in the 1930s, where she reviewed performances by Uday Shankar, Ailes Gilmour, Agnes de Mille, La Argentina, Tina Flade, Anita Zahn, Carola Goya, Valeska Gert, and Paul Haakon, among many others.

== Publications ==
Mishnun wrote The Indian's Dog (1942), a storybook, and other published materials, when she worked for the United States Bureau of Indian Affairs in the early 1940s. She wrote poetry, essays, book and arts reviews for various publications, including The Nation. Books Abroad, and The Humanist.

- "The Moon" (1927, poem)
- "A Serape is All You Need in Mexico" (1942, article for young readers)
- The Indian's Dog (1942, fiction for young readers)
- "Ballet at the Metropolitan" (1943, criticism)
- "Benjamin Franklin: Friend of the Indians" (1943, with Anita Tilden)
- "Mexico: Vacationlands Unlimited!" (1950, magazine article)
- "Visitor from Buchenwald", "A Time to Pray", "The Equality" "The Giver" (1961)
- The Inheritors and Other Poems (1962, poems)
- "In Birmingham" (1963)
- J. B. S. Hardman, Labor at the Rubicon (1973, editor)
- Bright Winter (1977, poems)

== Personal life ==
Mishnun was the second wife of labor leader, writer and editor J. B. S. Hardman; they married in 1964. Her husband died in 1968, and she died in 2003, at the age of 94, in Gloucester, Massachusetts.
