= Elin Jacobsson =

Swedish civil engineer (1886–1978)

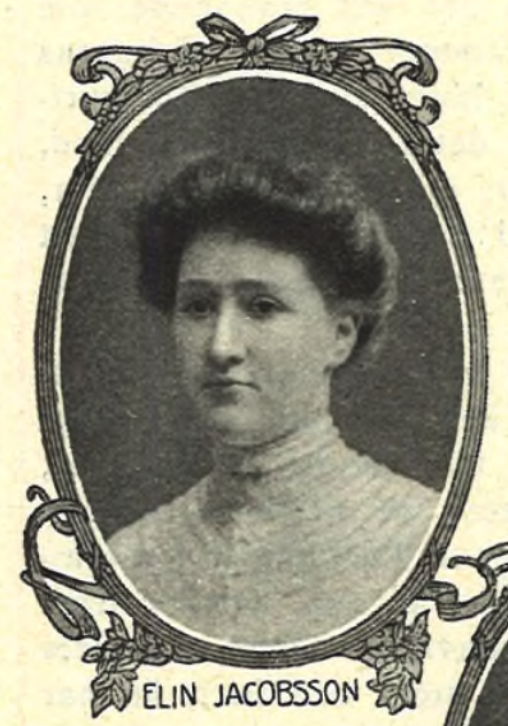
- Elin Jacobsson pictured in Idun, no. 19, 1907
- Born: Elin Maria Helena Jacobsson; 9 January 1886; Stockholm, Sweden
- Died: 14 July 1978 (aged 92); Stockholm, Sweden
- Burial place: Northern Cemetery
- Education: The Technical School
- Occupations: Civil engineer, architect

Elin Jacobsson (1886 – 1978), was one of the first two women to graduate from a Swedish educational program as a civil engineer.

== Early life ==
Elin Jacobsson was born on 9 January 1886 in Adolf Fredrik parish in Stockholm to August Leonard Jacobsson (born 1850), a cartographer at the General Staff Lithographic Institute, and Josefina Wilhelmina Bernhardina Jacobsson, nee Ammilon, born (1849). She had two brothers.

== Education ==
Jacobsson entered the Technical School in Stockholm (now called Konstfack) which had established a department for "female disciples" nearly five decades earlier in 1859. Women on this course of study were allowed to pursue "various types of education in, among other things, construction technology, mechanical engineering, drawing technology and in art industrial occupations."

After completing their studies as architectural draftsmen in the women's department in the school, Elin Jacobsson and her classmate Anna Sandstedt (born 1885) transferred to the Construction Vocational School department. That programme provided a three-year training course for students hoping to become supervisors in the construction industry. After having to get special permission from the school's board because they were women, the two students completed the mandatory six-month masonry internship, which was done in the "utmost secrecy" in the basement. In 1907, Elin Jacobsson and Anna Sandstedt graduated as "structural engineers," the first women to do so. The news was published in the women's magazine Idun.

== Career ==
In the 1910 census, Jacobsson is listed as a drawing assistant, and the next year, on 18 February 1911, she received an employment offer from architect Axel Brunskog in Linköping.

While details remain unknown about the lives of either woman in later years, Elin Jacobsson was reported to have worked as a draftsman and structural engineer at an architectural and engineering office.

== Private life ==
Elin Jacobsson married Bror Gustaf Johansson in 1913 and took his last name as her own. He died in 1954.

She died on 14 July 1978 in Hedvig Eleonora parish in Stockholm and is buried in her family's grave at the Northern Cemetery in Solna in Stockholm County.
