= Elin Lauritzen =

Swedish family lawyer (1916–2006)

Elin Maria Lauritzen (born 11 July 1916 in Rio de Janeiro, Brazil; died 17 September 2006) was for many years one of Sweden's foremost family law attorneys.

She was a member of the Board of Directors of the Pension Board in 1944 as well as Deputy Attorney at the lawyers Mathilda Staël von Holstein, Valborg Lundgren and Eva Andén 1945–1953. She became a member of the Swedish Bar Association in 1949.
