= Tilde (singer) =

Swedish soul singer

- Birth name: Tilde Ingham
- Origin: Gothenburg, Sweden
- Genres: Soul; Neo-soul; Pop; Indie
- Years active: 2015–present
- Labels: Vacanze Records
- Website: Official website

Tilde Ingham is a Swedish soul singer, songwriter and musician from the town of Gothenburg, Sweden.

In early 2018 she began recording her debut album, Nothing Gold Can Stay, at Spinroad Studios in Gothenburg with BRIT-award winning producer Pedro Ferreira (who previously worked with The Darkness and Swedish singer Albin Lee Meldau). The album was released in September 2018 on her independent record label Vacanze Records.

In 2019, Swedish newspaper Göteborgs-Posten placed the title track Nothing Gold Can Stay in the top ten of the best songs of the decade originating from the Swedish town of Gothenburg. Alongside big names such as Håkan Hellström and Laleh.

In November 2021 she released her second album, Pink Moon.

== Discography ==
Year	Album	Details
2018	Nothing Gold Can Stay	Label: Vacanze Records; Released: 28 September 2018; Format: Vinyl/LP, Digital
2021	Pink Moon	Label: Vacanze Records; Released: 19 November 2021; Format: Vinyl/LP, Digital
