= Elin Williams =

Welsh disability blogger (blurred vision)

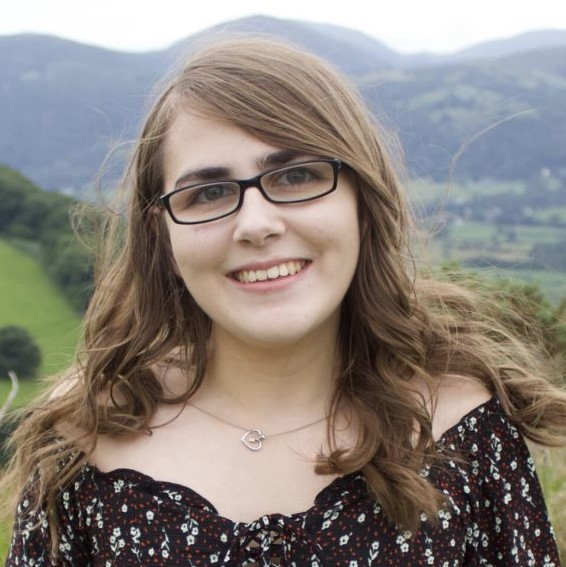

Elin Williams was born in Wales is an influencer and blogger notable for her award-winning blog My Blurred World. Including awards such as best lifestyle blog of 2018 for the teen blogger awards. Her blog promotes positive awareness around disability.

== Biography ==
Elin Williams was diagnosed with a degenerative eye condition called retinitis pigmentosa. She had started to lose her eyesight at the age of three, and was later diagnosed at the age of six. At age twelve she was registered blind/sight impaired, yet has some remaining vision.

Williams's eyesight significantly deteriorated and could no longer see large print format. Instead she had to transition towards using braille during the time she was taking her General Certificate of Secondary Education (GCSE)s. She already had learnt both English and Welsh, Williams had found the process of learning braille in French to be stressful. After completing her A-Level studies Williams worked at Royal National Institute of Blind People (RNIB) for a year. After this year of work, she enrolled at the Open University, where she studied for a BA (Hons) degree in creative writing.

Williams's blog originally started as a beauty blog but has since changed into a platform promoting guidance and positive action for young people with visual impairment. She wanted to share the emotional impact of losing her eyesight also to push for inclusivity and accessibility within the fashion industry. She had started her blog, My Blurred World, in 2015, and continues to write for her blog in 2022. Williams involves herself in other blogs as a guest writer for other blogs and charities, and is involved in different campaigns for RNIB. Her work has got a lot of recognition appearing on different influential blogger lists, and winning two different awards at the Teen Blogger Awards in 2018.

== Awards ==
- Best Lifestyle blog of 2018 - Teen Blogger Awards
- Disability Power 100 List 2018
- Shortlisted nominee: Social Media Influencer of the Year at the RNIB See Differently Awards 2019
- Featured in the BBC 100 Women List 2020
