= Dance Films Association =

The Dance Films Association (DFA) is a non-profit organization founded by Susan Braun in 1956; José Limón, Ted Shawn and Alicia Markova were charter members. Its stated purpose is, "Dedicated to furthering the art of dance film.".

DFA has held a film festival every year since 1971, which has been co-sponsored by the Film Society of Lincoln Center since 1996. It also arranges tours of dance films; in 2010 over forty venues were booked, from New York — the Museum of Modern Art — to Bialystok, Havana, Manipur and Istanbul.
