= Brigitte Nijman =

Dutch actress and singer

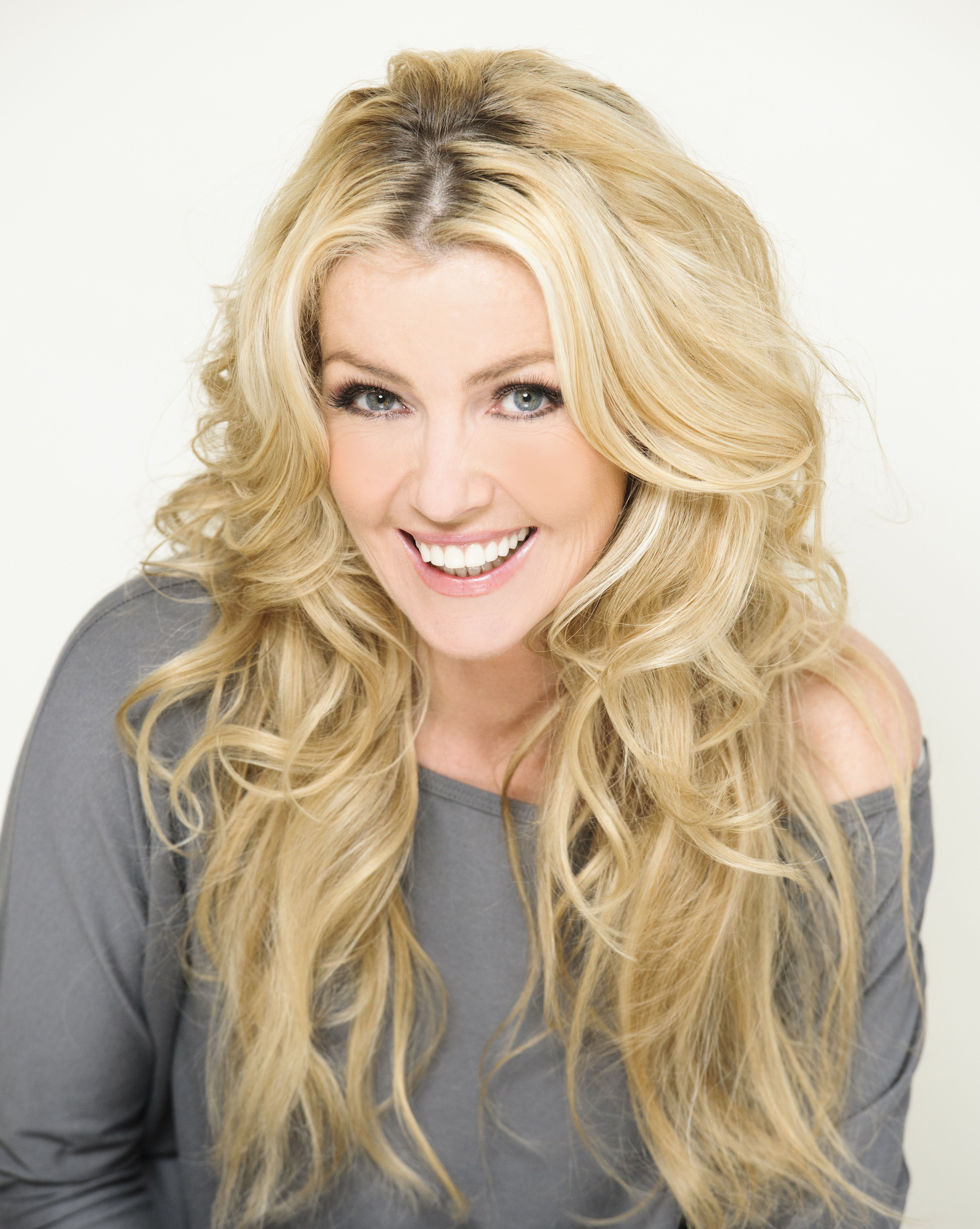
- Nijman in 2012.
- Born: Brigit Nijman; 12 July 1970 (age 56); The Hague, Netherlands

Brigitte Nijman (born 12 July 1970) is a Dutch actress and singer. She has done a lot of theater work such as roles in Ciske de Rat, Pietje Bell de musical and The Sound of Music.
