= Anita Zahn =

American dancer (1904–1995)

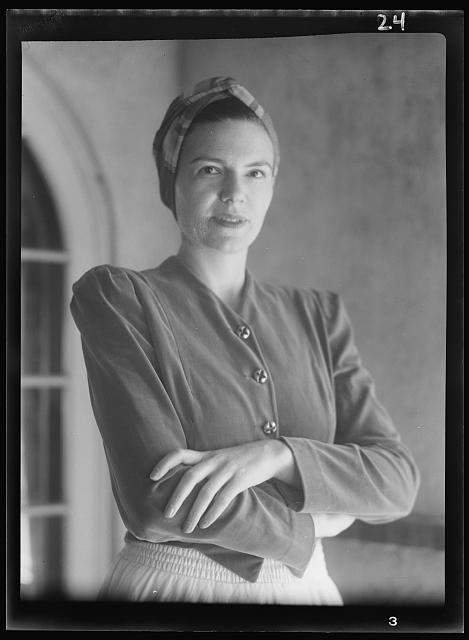
- Anita Zahn, photographed by Arnold Genthe before 1943
- Born: October 25, 1903; Mannheim, Baden, Germany
- Died: November 3, 1994 (aged 91); Grants Pass, Oregon, U.S.
- Other names: Anita Zahn Bauman
- Occupations: Dancer, choreographer, dance educator

Anita Zahn (October 25, 1903 – November 3, 1994) was a German-born American dancer, choreographer, and dance educator, associated with the pedagogy of Isadora Duncan. New York Times dance critic John Martin described Zahn in 1933 as "the first of the dancers in the Duncan tradition who has attempted to retain that tradition and at the same time to branch out into the more radical field of modernism."

== Early life and education ==
Zahn was born in Mannheim, Germany. She was one of the child dancers who toured the United States with Isadora Duncan's sister, teacher Elizabeth Duncan. The group stayed in America through World War I, from 1914 to 1920.

== Career ==
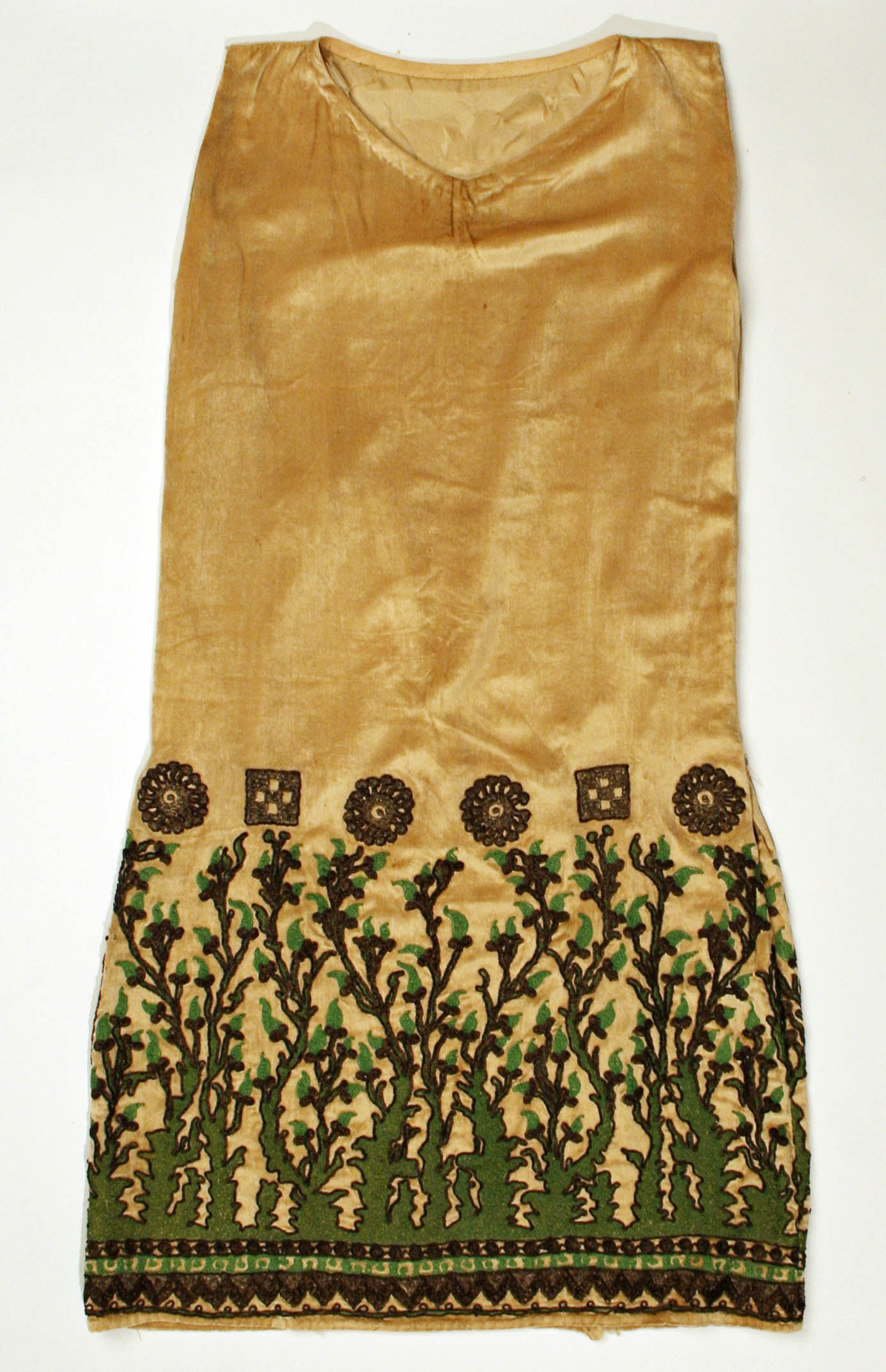
1920s evening dress by Babani; gifted to the Metropolitan Museum of Art by Anita Zahn in 1976

Zahn worked briefly in Switzerland from 1920 to 1922, then returned to the United States to dance and teach in New York City. She was director of the Elizabeth Duncan School in New York, and later opened the Anita Zahn School of Duncan Dancing in East Hampton, where she taught from 1936 to 1973. She also taught in Siasconset and in Summit, New Jersey, and at the Dalton School, and the Spence School for over twenty years. Her students included socialites Jacqueline Kennedy Onassis and Gloria Vanderbilt, writer Caroline Zilboorg, and dance archivist Susan Braun. Composer and pianist Mary Shambaugh provided accompaniment for Zahn's students.

Zahn arranged musical collaborations and "elaborate" recitals for her dance group's performances. They performed at Town Hall with Georges Barrère and his symphony in 1935. Her 1936 production was an anti-war program based in Walt Whitman's Leaves of Grass. Her students and the Vienna Boys' Choir gave a joint recital as a benefit concert in 1938. In 1940 she danced at the tercentenary celebration of Southampton. She trained child dancers for a 1944 Christmas production designed by Robert Edmond Jones, with Leopold Stokowski as conductor.

Dance critic John Martin described Zahn in 1933 as "a vital young person with a most agreeable stage presence" and as "the first of the dancers in the Duncan tradition who has attempted to retain that tradition and at the same time to branch out into the more radical field of modernism." In 1942, Martin considered Zahn as one of the more successful Duncan method proponents. "Nothing in the body should be mechanized," she told an interviewer in 1931. "One should move because an inner self wishes to come forth in movement, because something within asks for expression."

== Personal life ==
Zahn married pianist and composer Raymond Bauman in 1926, and had a son, Edmond; they divorced in the 1930s. She moved to Grants Pass, Oregon, in 1986, and died there in 1994, at the age of 91. Her papers are in the Jerome Robbins Dance Division, New York Public Library for the Performing Arts. The Isadora Duncan International Archive presents the Anita Zahn Award for the Education of the Child to outstanding dance teachers in the Duncan tradition.
