= Elin Pikkuniemi =

Swedish cross-country skier (1895–1988)

Personal information
- Born: 15 August 1895 Vojakkala, Sweden
- Died: 7 May 1988 (aged 92) Trönö, Sweden

Sport
- Sport: Skiing

Elin Eugenia Pikkuniemi (born 15 August 1895 Vojakkala, Sweden, died 7 May 1988 in Trönö, Sweden) was a Swedish cross-country skier and a primary-school teacher.

She was referred to as the first skiing queen of Sweden. and was part of the Swedish female cross-country skiing elite in the years around 1920. She competed for IFK Haparanda, winning five Swedish national championships between 1918–1922 over a distance of 10 kilometers. During the late 1920s she competed for Järla IF and during the 1930s she competed for Hietaniemi SK.

During the Swedish Sports Confederation's 50th anniversary in 1953, the daily newspaper Svenska Dagbladet held a vote for Sweden's greatest sportspersons, where approximately 500 readers voted, choosing 150 people in total. Amongst them was Elin Pikkuniemi as the only female.
