= Neyman =

Neyman is a surname. Notable people with the surname include:

- Abraham Neyman (born 1949), Israeli mathematician
- Benny Neyman (1951–2008), Dutch singer
- Jerzy Neyman (1894–1981), Polish mathematician; Neyman construction and Neyman–Pearson lemma
- Sergei Neyman (born 1967), Russian footballer
- Yuri Neyman (born c. 1950), Russian-American cinematographer, educator and inventor
