= Elin Kallio =

Finnish gymnast (1859–1927)

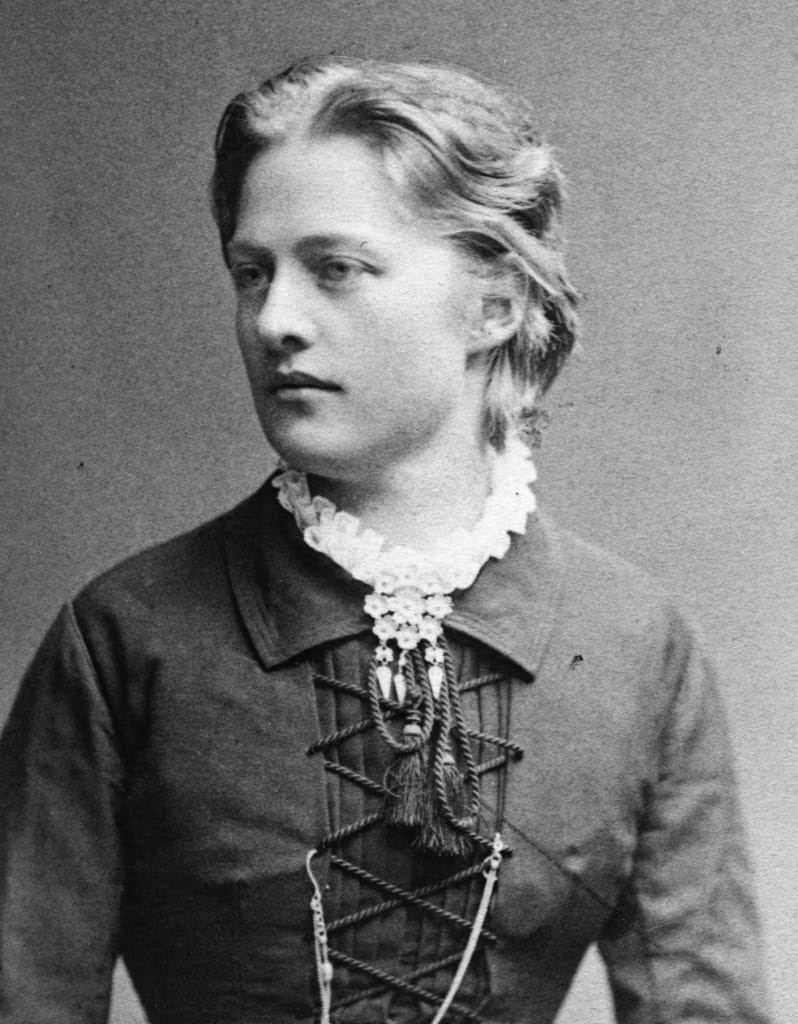
Kallio in 1882–83

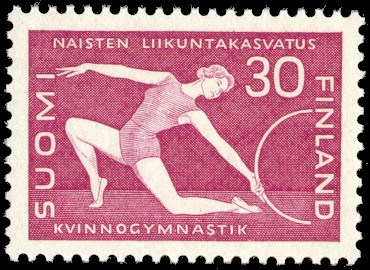
Kallio on a 1959 Finnish stamp

Elin Kallio (23 April 1859 Helsinki, Finland – 25 December 1927, Helsinki) was a celebrated pioneering Finnish gymnast. She is considered the founder of the women's gymnastic movement in Finland.

Kallio was educated at the Stockholm Royal Gymnastic Institute. She was a gymnastics instructor for thirty-four years at private Finnish girls schools and at the University of Helsinki. She founded the first Finnish association for female gymnasts in 1876 and this developed into the Federation of Finnish Women Gymnasts in 1896.

Kallio wrote extensively on the subject of gymnastics and women's physical education.

In 1959, a hundred years after her birth she was commemorated on a Finnish postal stamp.
