= Elin Svensson =

Swedish missionary (1879–1960)

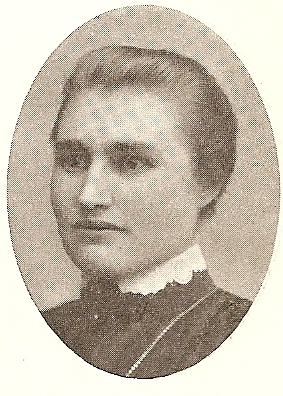
- Missionary to East Turkestan
- Born: 25 November 1879; Långared parish, Älvsborg County
- Died: 27 December 1960 (aged 81); Alingsås, Sweden

Elin Karolina Svensson (25 November 1879 – 27 December 1960) was a Swedish missionary. She served with the Mission Union of Sweden in Chinese Turkestan (present day Xinjiang).

Svensson was born in Långared parish, Älvsborg County and died in Alingsås 27 December 1960.

== Bibliography ==
- J. Lundahl (editor), På obanade stigar: Tjugofem år i Ost-Turkestan. Stockholm, Svenska Missionsförbundet Förlag, 1917
