= Elna Lassen =

Danish ballerina (1901–1930)

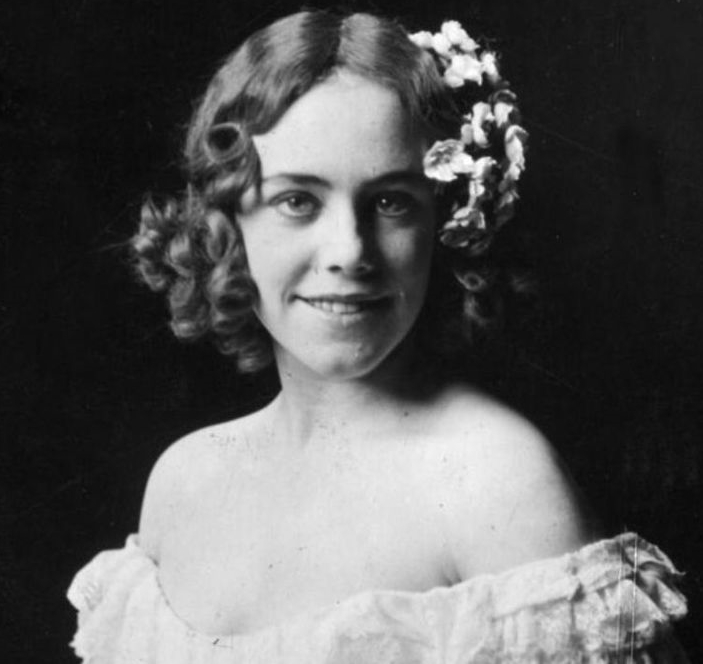
Elna Lassen

Elna Lassen (1901 – 1930) was a Danish ballerina who was the premiere danseuse of the Royal Danish Ballet. A diabetic, Lassen was found dead at her Copenhagen, Denmark apartment on the morning of September 20, 1930. She is thought to have committed suicide with a revolver which was found by her bedside.

The daughter of an unskilled laborer, she was married to a Copenhagen physician. Among her admirers was Max Reinhardt.

Lassen was ranked first in the Danish ballet after she returned home from studying ballet in the United States and Paris, France, from 1921–1924. She was tutored by Michel Fokine during her absence from Denmark.
