= Elin Tvete =

Norwegian politician (born 1976)

Elin Tvete (born 31 December 1976) is a Norwegian politician for the Centre Party.

She served as a deputy representative to the Parliament of Norway from Østfold during the term 2017–2021. She is a member Fredrikstad city council.
