= Elin Johansson (footballer) =

Swedish footballer (born 1992)

Personal information
- Date of birth: 28 April 1992 (age 34)
- Position: Defender

Senior career*
Years	Team	Apps	(Gls)
2010–2013	Sunnanå SK	42	(1)
2014–2015	Piteå IF	41	(4)
2016	KIF Örebro DFF	22	(0)
- * Club domestic league appearances and goals

Elin Johansson (born 28 April 1992) is a Swedish football midfielder. She has played for Sunnanå SK, Piteå IF, and KIF Örebro DFF.
