= Elin Sigvardsson =

Swedish singer (born 1981)

Elin Ruth
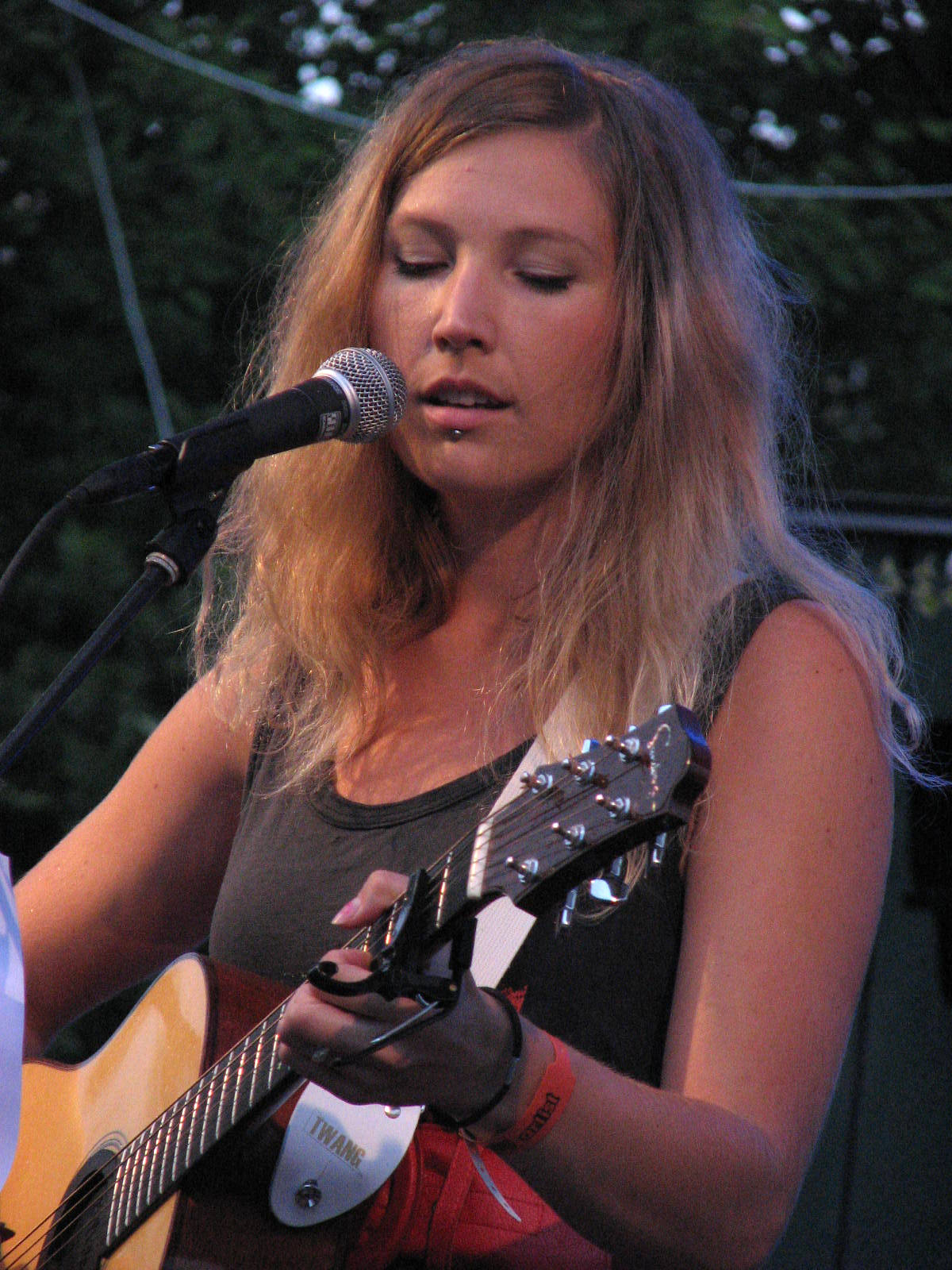

Background information
- Also known as: Elin Ruth Sigvardsson
- Born: Elin Sigvardsson; 23 November 1981 (age 44); Mönsterås, Småland
- Genres: country rock
- Occupations: singer guitarist songwriter
- Instrument: guitarist
- Years active: 2003 –
- Labels: Divers Avenue, Warner Music
- Website: ElinRuth.com

Elin Ruth (born 23 November 1981 in Mönsterås, Småland) is a Swedish singer-songwriter. Her music has been published variously under the names Elin Ruth, Elin Ruth Sigvardsson, and Elin Sigvardsson.

Elin Ruth debuted in 2003 with the album Saturday Light Naive which was produced by Lars Winnerbäck. The album was hailed by critics and led to a Swedish Grammy nomination for best new artist. In early 2005 she released her second album Smithereens, which she produced herself. In December 2007 she released her third album, A Fiction.

In 2009 Elin Ruth started her own record company, Divers Avenue Music, and on October 7 released her self-produced, fourth album Cookatoo Friends.

She moved to Stockholm at the age of 19, and moved to New York in 2011.

She wrote and performed the opening theme to the Swedish crime drama series Irene Huss, "Free to Fall (Apart)".

== Elin Ruth discography ==
=== Albums ===
- Through Myself And Back (2000)
- Saturday Light Naive (2003)
- Smithereens (2005)
- A Fiction (2007)
- Cookatoo Friends (2009)
- Queen Of Queens & The Last Man Standing LP (2012)
- Bang EP (2012)
- Here Comes the Storm (2014)
- Debris (2015)
- Christmas Is a Drag (2015)
