= Carol Smart =

Feminist sociologist

- Born: 20 December 1948 (age 77)
- Known for: The study of relationships and personal lives
- Scientific career
- Fields: Sociology, criminology
- Workplaces: University of Manchester

Carol Christine Smart CBE (born 20 December 1948) is a feminist sociologist and academic at the University of Manchester. She has also conducted research about divorce and children of divorced couples.

Smart is an important figure within the feminist criminology world. Her book titled Women, Crime and Criminology, written in 1976, remains a key feminist critique of criminology. Smart was also the co-director of the Morgan Centre for the Study of Relationships and Personal Life at Manchester.

== Career ==
Smart began her academic career by studying sociology at Portsmouth Polytechnic, which is now Portsmouth University. After completing her BA, she moved on to complete her master's degree in criminology from the University of Sheffield. She also completed her PhD in Socio-Legal studies also from Sheffield in 1983.

Smart began her teaching career at the then, Trent Polytechnic, (as a lecturer and senior lecturer). After that, she became a professor at the University of Leeds. In 2005, she moved to the Morgan Centre for the Study of Relationships and Personal Life in the Arthur Lewis Building of the University of Manchester, where she was co-director. She retired in 2014.

Smart has published works in the areas of criminology, family law and social policy. Her main interests over the last few years have been family life and intimacy and how people conduct their personal lives. Smart has done much research on divorce and separation and how this affects children, the couple and other kin, and on gay and lesbian civil partnerships and their commitment ceremonies. More recently she has been working on 'Relative Strangers', a project which explores the experiences of families with donor-conceived children.

She was appointed Commander of the Order of the British Empire (CBE) in the 2017 New Year Honours for services to the social sciences.

== Bibliography ==
=== Radio ===
- Presenters: Laurie Taylor (26 September 2011). "Understanding suicide – families, secrets and memories.". Thinking Allowed. London. BBC. BBC Radio 4. Retrieved 11 July 2013.

=== Books ===
- Smart, Carol (1977). Women, crime, and criminology: a feminist critique. London Boston: Routledge & K. Paul. ISBN 9780710088338.
  - Gorman, Eleanor Miller (September 1978). "Women, crime and criminology: a feminist critique. by Carol Smart (Book review)". American Journal of Sociology. 84 (2): 501–503. doi:10.1086/226810. JSTOR 2777875.
  - Simon, Rita J. (Spring 1979). "Women, crime and criminology: a feminist critique. by Carol Smart (Book review)". Journal of Criminal Law and Criminology. 70 (1 article 10): 143–144. doi:10.2307/1142979. JSTOR 1142979.
  - Book review (November 1977). "Women, crime and criminology: a feminist critique. by Carol Smart (Book review)". Contemporary Sociology: A Journal of Reviews. 6 (6): 672–673. doi:10.2307/2066333. JSTOR 2066333.
  - Book review (March 1979). "Women, crime and criminology: a feminist critique. by Carol Smart (Book review)". Social Forces. 57 (3): 1027–1028. doi:10.2307/2577401. JSTOR 2577401.
- Smart, Carol; Smart, Barry (eds) (1978). Women, sexuality, and social control. London Boston: Routledge and K. Paul. ISBN 9780710087232.
  - Delamont, Sara (September 1979). "Women, sexuality, and social control. edited by Carol Smart and Barry Smart (Book review)". British Journal of Sociology. 30 (3): 386–387. doi:10.2307/589927. JSTOR 589927.
- Smart, Carol (1984). The ties that bind: law, marriage, and the reproduction of patriarchal relations. London Boston: Routledge & Kegan Paul. ISBN 9780710098320.
  - Book review (February 1985). "The ties that bind: law, marriage, and the reproduction of patriarchal relations. by Carol Smart (Book review)". Journal of Marriage and the Family. 47 (1): 240–241. doi:10.2307/352090. JSTOR 352090.
  - Book review (November 1985). "The ties that bind: law, marriage, and the reproduction of patriarchal relations. by Carol Smart (Book review)". Contemporary Sociology. 14 (6): 746–747. doi:10.2307/2071458. JSTOR 2071458.
- Smart, Carol; Sevenhuijsen, Selma (1989). Child custody and the politics of gender. London New York: Routledge. ISBN 9780415026697.
  - Luxton, Meg (November 1990). "Child Custody and the Politics of Gender. by Carol Smart and Selma Sevenhuijsen (Book review)". Journal of Marriage and the Family. 52 (4): 1153–1154. doi:10.2307/353327. JSTOR 353327.
- Smart, Carol (1989). Feminism and the power of law. London New York: Routledge. ISBN 9780203206164.
- Smart, Carol (1992). Regulating womanhood: historical essays on marriage, motherhood, and sexuality. London New York: Routledge. ISBN 9780415074056.
  - Yeatman, Anna (September 1993). "Regulating womanhood: historical essays on marriage, motherhood, and sexuality. by Carol Smart (Book review)". American Journal of Sociology. 99 (2): 538–540. doi:10.1086/230306. JSTOR 2781720.
- Smart, Carol (1995). Law, crime and sexuality: essays in feminism. London Thousand Oaks Calif: Sage Pub. ISBN 9780803989603.
- Smart, Carol; Neale, Bren; Wade, Amanda (2001). The changing experience of childhood: families and divorce. Malden, MA: Blackwell Publishers. ISBN 9780745624006.
  - Book review (May 2003). "The changing experience of childhood: families and divorce. by Carol Smart; Bren Neale and Amanda Wade (Book review)". Contemporary Sociology. 32 (3): 307–308. doi:10.2307/3089162. JSTOR 3089162.
  - Morrow, Virginia (June 2002). "The changing experience of childhood: families and divorce. by Carol Smart; Bren Neale and Amanda Wade (Book review)". Acta Sociologica. 45 (2): 166–168. doi:10.1177/000169930204500209. S2CID 142159016.
- Neale, Bren; Smart, Carol (2001). Good to talk?: conversations with children after divorce. London: Young Voice. ISBN 9781903456026.
- Smart, Carol; Wade, Amanda (2002). Facing family change: children's circumstances, strategies and resources. York: York Publishing Services for Joseph Rowntree Foundation. ISBN 9781842630778.
- Smart, Carol (2007). Personal life: new directions in sociological thinking. Cambridge, UK Malden, MA: Polity. ISBN 9780745639178.
- Smart, Carol; Heaphy, Brian; Einarsdottir, Anna (2013). Same sex marriages: new generations, new relationships. Genders and sexualities in the social sciences. Houndmills, Basingstoke, Hampshire: Palgrave Macmillan. ISBN 9780230300231.

=== Journal articles ===
- Smart, Carol (March 1977). "Criminological theory: its ideology and implications concerning women". The British Journal of Sociology. 28 (1): 89–100. doi:10.2307/589710. JSTOR 589710. PMID 858017.
  - Reproduced as:
    - Smart, Carol (1995), "Criminological theory: its ideology and implications concerning women.", in Smart, Carol (ed.), Law, crime and sexuality : essays in feminism, London Thousand Oaks Calif: Sage Pub, pp. 16–31, ISBN 9780803989603
    - Smart, Carol (2008), "Chapter 1.1 Criminological theory: its ideology and implications concerning women.", in Evans, Karen; Jamieson, Janet (eds.), Gender and crime: a reader, Maidenhead, Berkshire, England New York: Open University Press, pp. 5–15, ISBN 9780335225231 (Available online.)
- Smart, Carol (1982). "Regulating families or legitimising patriarchy? – family law in Britain". International Journal of the Sociology of Law. 10 (2): 129–147.
- Smart, Carol (March 1984). "Social policy and drug addiction: a critical study of policy development". British Journal of Addiction. 79 (1): 31–39. doi:10.1111/j.1360-0443.1984.tb00245.x. PMID 6584163.
- Smart, Carol (1986). "Feminism and law: some problems of analysis and strategy". International Journal of the Sociology of Law. 14 (2): 109–123.
- Smart, Carol (1991). "The legal and moral ordering of child custody". Journal of Law and Society. 18 (4): 485–500. doi:10.2307/1410322. JSTOR 1410322.
- Smart, Carol (March 1992). "The woman of legal discourse". Social and Legal Studies. 1 (1): 29–44. doi:10.1177/096466399200100103. S2CID 144586759.
  - Reproduced as:
    - Smart, Carol (1995), "The woman of legal discourse.", in Smart, Carol (ed.), Law, crime and sexuality : essays in feminism, London Thousand Oaks Calif: Sage Pub, pp. 186–202, ISBN 9780803989603
- Smart, Carol (9 March 2006). "Children's narratives of post-divorce family life: from individual experience to an ethical disposition". The Sociological Review. 54 (1): 155–170. doi:10.1111/j.1467-954X.2006.00606.x. S2CID 142980249.
- Smart, Carol; Neale, Bren (1997). "'Good' and 'bad' lawyers? Struggling in the shadow of the new law". Journal of Social Welfare and Family Law. 19 (4): 377–402. doi:10.1080/09649069708410207.
- Smart, Carol (July 2002). "From children's shoes to children's voices?". Family Court Review. 40 (3): 305–319. doi:10.1111/j.174-1617.2002.tb00842.x.
- Smart, Carol (May 2003). "New Perspectives on Childhood and Divorce: an introduction?". Childhood: A Global Journal of Child Research. 10 (2): 123–129. doi:10.1177/0907568203010002001. S2CID 220341113.
- Smart, Carol (2003). "Towards an understanding of family change: gender conflict and children's citizenship?". Australian Journal of Family Law. 17: 1–17. ISSN 0817-623X.
- Smart, Carol; May, Vanessa (2004). "Why can't they agree: the underlying complexity of contact and residence disputes". Journal of Social Welfare and Family Law. 26 (4): 347–360. doi:10.1080/0964906042000334046. S2CID 8869643.
- Smart, Carol; Shipman, Beccy (December 2004). "Vision in monochrome: families, marriage and the individualization thesis" (PDF). British Journal of Sociology. 55 (4): 491–509. doi:10.1111/j.1468-4446.2004.00034.x. PMID 15663421.
- Smart, Carol; May, Vanessa (2004). "Silence in court?: Hearing children in residence and contact disputes?". Child and Family Law Quarterly. 16 (3): 305–315.
- Smart, Carol (2004). "Changing landscapes of family life: rethinking divorce?". Social Policy and Society. 3 (4): 401–408. doi:10.1017/S1474746404002040. S2CID 153466522.
- Smart, Carol (November 2004). "Equal Shares: Rights for Fathers or Recognition for Children?". Critical Social Policy. 24 (4): 484–50. doi:10.1177/0261018304046673. S2CID 144327234.
- Smart, Carol (October 2005). "Textures of family life: further thoughts on change and commitment". Journal of Social Policy. 34 (4): 541–556. doi:10.1017/S0047279405009141. S2CID 146469726.
- Smart, Carol (February 2006). "Shifting Horizons: reflections on qualitative methods". Feminist Theory. 10 (3): 295–308. doi:10.1177/1464700109343253. S2CID 144143652.
- Smart, Carol (November 2007). "Same sex couples and marriage: negotiating relational landscapes with families and friends". The Sociological Review. 55 (4): 671–686. doi:10.1111/j.1467-954X.2007.00747.x. S2CID 31825187.
- Smart, Carol (January 2007). ""It's made a huge difference": Recognition, rights and the personal significance of civil partnership" (PDF). Sociological Research Online. 22 (1): 1360–7804. doi:10.5153/sro.1340. S2CID 56218620.
- Smart, Carol (December 2008). ""Can I be bridesmaid?": Combining the personal and political in same-sex weddings". Sexualities. 11 (6): 761–776. doi:10.1177/1363460708096917. S2CID 143839649.
- Smart, Carol (October 2009). "Family secrets: law and understandings of openness in everyday relationships". Journal of Social Policy. 38 (4): 551–567. doi:10.1017/S0047279409003237. S2CID 51780984.
- Smart, Carol (October 2010). "Law and the regulation of family secrets". International Journal of Law, Policy and the Family. 24 (3): 397–413. doi:10.1093/lawfam/ebq007.

=== Book chapters ===
- Smart, Carol (1995), "Criminological theory: its ideology and implications concerning women.", in Smart, Carol (ed.), Law, crime and sexuality : essays in feminism, London Thousand Oaks Calif: Sage Pub, pp. 16–31, ISBN 9780803989603
- Smart, Carol (1995), "The woman of legal discourse.", in Smart, Carol (ed.), Law, crime and sexuality : essays in feminism, London Thousand Oaks Calif: Sage Pub, pp. 186–202, ISBN 9780803989603
- Smart, Carol (1998), "Chapter 2: the woman of legal discourse", in Daly, Kathleen; Maher, Lisa (eds.), Criminology at the crossroads: feminist readings in crime and justice, New York: Oxford University Press, pp. 21–36, ISBN 9780195113433
- Smart, Carol (2000), "New dimensions to gendered power relations in families.", in Cook, Joanne; Roberts, Jennifer; Waylen, Georgina (eds.), Towards a gendered political economy, New York: St. Martin's Press in association with Political Economy Research Centre, the University of Sheffield, pp. 188–204, ISBN 9780333748718
- Smart, Carol (2000), "Divorce in England 1950–2000: a moral tale?", in Katz, Sanford N.; Eekelaar, John; Maclean, Mavis (eds.), Cross currents: family law and policy in the United States and England, Oxford: Oxford University Press, pp. 363–387, ISBN 9780198299448
- Smart, Carol; Neale, Bren (2002), "Caring, earning and changing: parenthood and employment after divorce.", in Carling, Alan; Duncan, Simon; Edwards, Rosalind (eds.), Analysing families : morality and rationality in policy and practice, London New York: Routledge, pp. 183–198, ISBN 9780415250405
- Smart, Carol (2003), "Chapter 10: Children and the transformation of family law.", in Dewar, John; Parker, Stephen (eds.), Family law processes, practices, and pressures: proceedings of the Tenth World Conference of the International Society of Family Law, July 2000, Brisbane, Australia, Oxford: Hart Publishing, pp. 719–720, ISBN 9781841133089
- Smart, Carol; Wade, Amanda (2003), "As fair as it can be? childhood after divorce.", in Jensen, An-Magritt; McKee, Lorna (eds.), Children and the changing family: between transformation and negotiation, London New York: RoutledgeFalmer, pp. 105–119, ISBN 9780415277747
- Smart, Carol (2005), "Changing commitments: a study of close kin after divorce.", in Maclean, Mavis (ed.), Family law and family values, Oxford Portland, Oregon: Hart Publishing Ltd, pp. 137–153, ISBN 9781841135489
- Smart, Carol (2006), "The ethic of justice strikes back: changing narratives of fatherhood.", in Diduck, Alison; O'Donovan, Katherine (eds.), Feminist perspectives on family law, Abingdon England New York: Glass House Publications, Routledge-Cavendish, pp. 123–138, ISBN 9780415420365
- Smart, Carol (2006), "Parenting disputes, gender conflict and the courts.", in Thorpe, Mathew; Budden, Rosemary (eds.), Durable solutions: The collected papers of the Family Justice Councils' Interdisciplinary Conference (and associated plenary sessions), held at Dartington Hall Conference Centre, Bristol: Family Law, Jordan Publishers, pp. 103–111, ISBN 9781846610035
- Smart, Carol (2006), "Preface", in Sheldon, Sally; Collier, Richard (eds.), Fathers' rights activism and law reform in comparative perspective, Oxford Portland, Oregon: Hart, pp. vii–xii, ISBN 9781847312808
- May, Vanessa; Smart, Carol (2007), "The parenting contest: problems of ongoing conflict over children.", in Maclean, Mavis (ed.), Parenting after partnering : containing conflict after separation, Oxford Portland, Oregon: Hart Publishing, pp. 65–80, ISBN 9781841137827
- Smart, Carol (2008), "Chapter 1.1 Criminological theory: its ideology and implications concerning women.", in Evans, Karen; Jamieson, Janet (eds.), Gender and crime: a reader, Maidenhead, Berkshire, England New York: Open University Press, pp. 5–15, ISBN 9780335225231 (Available online.)
- Smart, Carol (2009), "Making kin: relationality and law", in Bottomley, Anne; Wong, Simone (eds.), Changing contours of domestic life, family and law : caring and sharing., Oxford Portland, Oregon: Hart Publishing, pp. 7–24, ISBN 9781841139043
- Smart, Carol (2010), "Resensando el derecho de familia. (Rethinking family law.)", in Heim, Daniela; Bodelón González, Encarna (eds.), Derecho, género e igualdad : cambios en las estructuras jurídicas androcéntricas, vol. 1, Bellaterra: Grupo Antígona, Universitat Autònoma de Barcelona, pp. 355–372, ISBN 9788469291900
- Smart, Carol (2011), "Close relationships and personal life.", in May, Vanessa (ed.), Sociology of personal life, Houndmills, Basingstoke, Hampshire New York: Palgrave Macmillan, pp. 35–47, ISBN 9780230278974
- Smart, Carol (2011), "Children's personal lives.", in May, Vanessa (ed.), Sociology of personal life, Houndmills, Basingstoke, Hampshire New York: Palgrave Macmillan, pp. 98–108, ISBN 9780230278974
- Smart, Carol (2011), "Relationality and socio-cultural theories of family life", in Jallinoja, Riitta; Widmer, Eric (eds.), Families and kinship in contemporary Europe : rules and practices of relatedness, Houndmills, Basingstoke, Hampshire New York: Palgrave Macmillan, pp. 13–30, ISBN 9780230284289

=== Reports ===
A set of reports funded by the Department for Constitutional Affairs using qualitative data, specifically, interviews with parents who had taken their disputes over residence and contact with their children to court. The 2003 reports relate to interviews conducted at the start of the legal process whilst the 2005 reports relate to interviews conducted as the cases were concluded.

- Smart, Carol; May, Vanessa; Wade, Amanda; Furniss, Clare (2003). Residence and contact disputes in court: volume 1. DCA Research Series. London: Dept. for Constitutional Affairs, Research Unit (HMSO). ISBN 978-1-84099-052-2.
- Smart, Carol; May, Vanessa; Wade, Amanda; Furniss, Clare (2003). Residence and contact disputes in court: volume 2. DCA Research Series. London: Dept. for Constitutional Affairs, Research Unit (HMSO). ISBN 978-1-84099-060-7.

=== The Cambridge dictionary of sociology ===
Smart has provided definitions for the following words in The Cambridge Dictionary of Sociology :

- Family (pages 189–195).
- Lone-parent Family (pages 341–342).
- Marriage and Divorce (pages 354–359).
- Sexual Abuse (pages 547–548).
- Siblings (page 550).

== See also ==
- Dame Janet Finch
- David Morgan (sociologist)
- Child custody
- Gender studies
- Parental rights
- Paternity (law)
- University of Warwick
