= Elin Nyman =

Swedish footballer (born 1991)

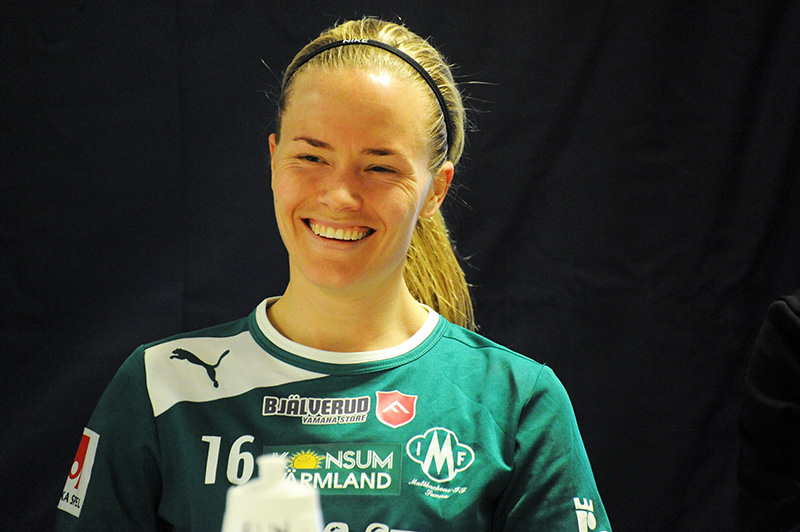

Personal information
- Full name: Elin Nyman
- Date of birth: 30 January 1991 (age 35)
- Place of birth: Sweden
- Position: Midfielder

Senior career*
Years	Team	Apps	(Gls)
2011	Kvarnsvedens IK	12	(2)
2012–2014	QBIK	68	(8)
2015–2017	Mallbackens IF	63	(6)
- * Club domestic league appearances and goals as of 13:13, 15 December 2018 (UTC)

Elin Nyman (born 30 January 1991) is a Swedish football midfielder who played for Mallbackens IF.
