= Elin Kvande =

Norwegian sociologist and gender researcher (born 1951)

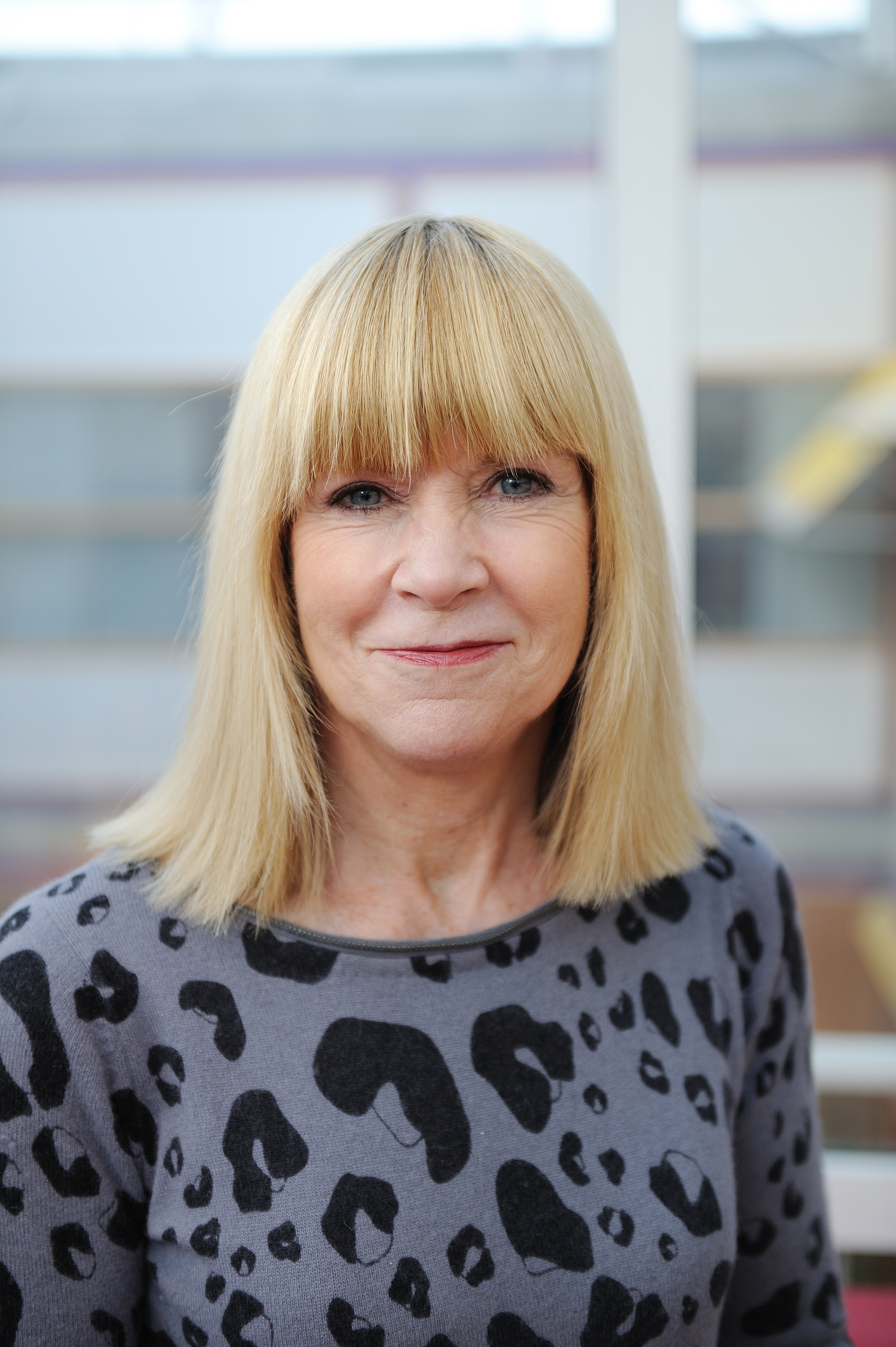
Elin Kvande (2011)

Elin Kvande (born 6 December 1951) is a Norwegian sociologist and gender researcher. She has been professor of sociology at Norwegian University of Science and Technology (NTNU) since 1999. Her research areas are organization and management, new forms of organization and globalization, and welfare state politics.

== Biography ==
Kvande took a major in sociology at the University of Trondheim in 1979 and received her doctorate in sociology in 1999. She has been a guest researcher at the University of Warwick, Linköping University, and the London School of Economics. She is a member of the Royal Norwegian Science Society. In June 2015, she was appointed as a member of the public committee who was to assess public support schemes for families with children. The committee was appointed by Minister of Children and Family Affairs, Solveig Horne.

== Selected works ==
- 2015 – Den norske modellen. ISBN 978-82-450-1780-9
- 2013 – Fedrekvoten og den farsvennlige velferdsstaten. ISBN 9788215021898
- 2007 – Doing Gender Gender in Flexible Organizations
- 2007 – Arbeidslivets klemmer. Paradokser i det nye arbeidslivet.
- 2005 – Gender, Bodies and Work.
- 2005 – Valgfrihetens tid, omsorgspolitikk for barn i det fleksible arbeidsliv.
- 2003 – Fleksible fedre. Arbeid-Maskulinitet-Velferdsstat.
- 1991 – Nye kvinneliv. Kvinner i menns organisasjoner.
