= Pure Theory of Law =

Book by Hans Kelsen

- Author: Hans Kelsen
- Original title: Reine Rechtslehre
- Translator: Max Knight
- Language: German
- Genre: Legal philosophy
- Publisher: University of California Press, Franz Deuticke
- Publication date: 1960
- Publication place: Austria
- English publication date: 1967
- Media type: print
- Pages: 356
- OCLC: 349106

Pure Theory of Law is a book by jurist and legal theorist Hans Kelsen, first published in German in 1934 as Reine Rechtslehre, and in 1960 in a much revised and expanded edition. The latter was translated into English in 1967 as Pure Theory of Law. The title is the name of his general theory of law, Reine Rechtslehre.

Kelsen began to formulate his theory as early as 1913, as a "pure" form of "legal science" devoid of any moral or political, or at a general level sociological considerations. Its main themes include the concept of "norms" as the fundamental building blocks of law and hierarchical relations of empowerment among them, including the idea of a "basic norm" providing an ultimate theoretical basis of empowerment; the ideas of "validity" and "efficacy" of norms; legal "normativity"; absence of any necessary relation between law and morality; complete separation between description and evaluation of law; and ideas relating to legal positivism and international law.

The impact of the book has been enduring and widespread, and it is considered one of the seminal works of legal philosophy of the twentieth century.

== Background ==
=== Positivism ===
The central question of jurisprudence is, "What is the nature of the law?" Two major schools of legal theory that address this question are natural law theory and legal positivism. The main point of contention between the two is the relation between law and morality, with the positivists advocating a weak or non-existent connection. An early proponent of positivism was John Austin, who, following Jeremy Bentham, viewed law as commands from a recognized source (i.e., a sovereign) backed up by threat of sanctions where the subjects have a duty to obey. All these concepts (law, sovereign, command, sanction, duty) are specific, socially defined events and, according to Austin, they are sufficient—no appeal to morality is required in order to determine what the law is (though it may play an advisory role).

Positivism traditionally says that the existence of a legal system in a given society depends solely on structures of governance, and laws are whatever rules have been declared ("posited") and accepted, and which are recognized by officials as authoritative (legislation, judicial decisions, etc.) without recourse to any value judgment of merit, such as whether they are just, deserved, or democratic. That said, there are many interpretations of, and countercurrents within positivism, including uncertainty and criticism.

Austin wished to transform law into a true science, without recourse to any moralistic notions, based on the ideas that law and morality are separate. Austin's views were highly influential in the 19th and early 20th centuries and set the stage for Kelsen.

Kelsen considered the ideas he expounded in the first, 1934 edition of Pure Theory of Law as "a further development of approaches ... that have been introducing themselves by the positivistic jurisprudence in the nineteenth century".

=== Precursors ===
Already in 1913, Kelsen had identified the need for a legal theoretic framework to support the idea of the Rechtsstaat.

Adolf Julius Merkl was a student of Kelsen's who made important contributions starting in 1918 in the area of hierarchy of norms that would help underpin some of Kelsen's ideas on norms and how they fit into his pure theory of law.

== Terminology ==
Kelsen used some formal terms from the philosophy of law which had been in use for centuries, and developed others in his own way. Here is a list of some of the most important terms that appear in Pure Theory of Law:

- basic norm (Grundnorm) – the fundamental norm in the hierarchy of norms, providing authority for all lower norms
- ought – the "is" and "ought" problem involves terms that go back to Kant, Hume, and others. Kelsen preferred the ought (Sollen) or an ought proposition (Sollsatz) to norm because of the latter's dual sense of both descriptive (e.g., some behavior "is the norm", which Kelsen does not use) and prescriptive social norms.
- positive vs. normative – this parallels the "is—ought" distinction. See Normative statement.
- positive law – (from 'posit', that which is ordered, decided, etc.) was first developed by Jeremy Bentham and redeveloped and popularized by John Austin, although its roots go back further. For a century, Austin's description of law as the command of a sovereign backed by force was ascendant. By the mid-twentieth century, this began to be challenged by analytical philosophers where ideas of force yielded to theories about law's systematic and normative nature. The most important modern figures are Kelsen, H.L.A. Hart, and Joseph Raz. The school of philosophy based on it is called legal positivism.
- pure theory – Kelsen described pure theory as the "only theory of law capable of lifting jurisprudence to the status of a genuine science" But Vinx says, "What Kelsen's understanding of what it would mean for jurisprudence to be scientific has proven to be rather elusive."

== Key themes ==
=== "Is" and "ought" ===
The theme of "is" and "ought" is not original with Kelsen, but it runs through the entire book. In particular, Kelsen uses the idea of "is" and "ought" as a foundation for his introduction of "norm". Kelsen said that to say that "something exists", is very different from saying that "something ought to exist". The first assertion is about the current reality, the second is a normative order, or simply, a "norm".

Kelsen wrote, "The word ought is used here in a broader than the usual sense. According to customary usage, ought corresponds only to a command, while may corresponds to a permission, and can to an authorization. But in the present work the word ought is used to express the normative meaning of an act directed toward the behavior of others; this ought includes may and can."

=== Hierarchy of norms ===
The hierarchy of norms, or hierarchy of laws, is an analysis which views laws as occupying a hierarchy in which laws base their validity upon a higher level norm, and so on, forming a hierarchy, such that laws are validated in a regression of validity ending in the Constitution. The hierarchy concept is often referred to in French legal texts, and is often visualized and named "Kelsen's pyramid" (see below).

=== Basic norm ===
The idea of the basic norm (German: Grundnorm) is Kelsen's attempt to answer the question of where legal validity ultimately comes from, in a legal system which can be viewed as a set of legal norms which form a hierarchy where higher-level norms authorize the validity of lower-level norms. The top level might be a Constitution in some legal systems, but what authorizes its validity?

Kelsen's viewed the central issue of any theory of law as that of explaining where the notion of "legality" and the normativity of the law comes from. Why are certain words and actions interpreted as "law" and others are not? In particular, he wanted to do so in a "pure" fashion, that is, without recourse to outside support from jurisprudence, or from "legal science" (German: Rechtswissenschaft). Kelsen viewed the law as a scheme of interpretation whose reality existed in meaning itself, as opposed to, say, the acts of a legislature which might draft a bill, debate it, vote on it, tally the "yeses", and declare it "passed" using some verbiage. Describing these actions are not themselves the law, they are the description of the enactment; so where in this is "the law"? Kelsen's answer is that such acts derive their legal-normative character by dint of another, "higher" legal norm, that conveys legality upon it, in the example, authorizing the legislature's procedures for creating a law in this way. This higher legal norm, is only valid in turn, if another, even higher norm conveys legality upon it. The problem is, that at some point, some authorizing norm is the highest one, which in the case of the United States, for example, is the Constitution of the United States, and there isn't a higher norm that authorizes the Constitution.

At this point, Kelsen argued that one must "presuppose" the legal validity of the Constitution; other legal systems have the same issue, and whatever the highest legal norm is, its validity (Rechtsgültigkeit) must be presupposed (vorausgesetzt / vorauszusetzen). It is the content of this presupposition itself, that Kelsen calls the "basic norm".

== Evolution ==
The book was published in two editions a quarter century apart, and there was a considerable evolution of Kelsen's views during that period. In addition, there are precursors in his earlier writings, and further development after the second edition, as can be seen especially in his incomplete work General Theory of Norms, published posthumously.

Stanley L. Paulson wrote of this evolution, and proposed a periodization of Kelsen’s Pure Theory of Law in four phases:

1. 1911 to c. 1920 – constructivist
2. c. 1920 to the mid-1930s – a strong neo-Kantian phase; includes the first edition of Reine Rechtslehre
3. late 1930s to 1960 – a weak neo-Kantian phase; second edition of Reine Rechtslehre
4. 1960 onward – skeptical, or empiricist, phase; including General Theory of Norms

Paulson quotes Carsten Heidemann's periodization as: "constructivist, transcendental, realist, and analytico-linguistic", and a debate ensued in the literature about how best to interpret the evolution of Kelsen's thought in this area.

== Impact and influence ==
=== Reception ===
Kelsen has been called the "twentieth century's foremost jurist and legal philosopher", and his book "the single most important intellectual achievement of contemporary jurisprudence". His work has influenced numerous legal philosophers for many decades, and conferences are organized to discuss it, such as the 2010 conference in Oxford marking the 50th anniversary of the appearance of the highly influential second edition of the book.

Among writers in English, the influence of Kelsen's work can be seen in the work of John Gardner, Leslie Green, J. W. Harris, Tony Honoré, Joseph Raz, and from a critical viewpoint, in that of John Finnis.

=== By country ===
Kelsen's concept of a "hierarchy of norms" has had important influence in the legal systems of different countries.

==== Austria ====
Austrian universities teach the theory of the hierarchical structure of the legal order (Lehre vom Stufenbau der Rechtsordnung), a key theme of the Pure Theory of Law. This includes the topic of the primacy of the Constitution (Verfassungsvorrang; a term however which is barely used in Austria). Parts of the hierarchical structure were introduced by Adolf Julius Merkl.

==== France ====
In France, the legal system is viewed as structured according to the hierarchical system defined by Kelsen's theory of law, which underlies France's view of itself as an État de droit (Rechtstaat).

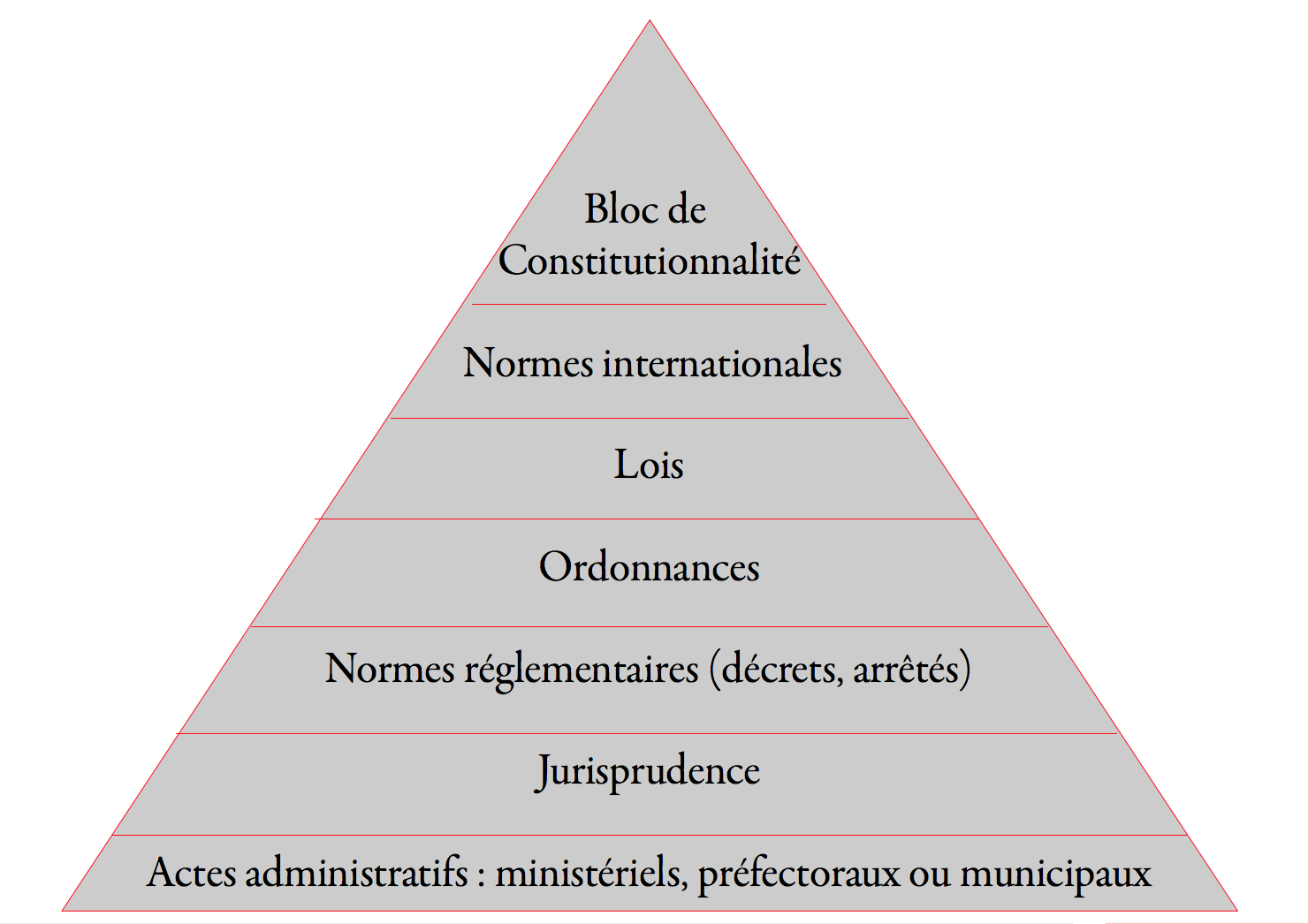
Kelsen's pyramid of norms as applied to France, with the Constitutional block at the top

Since the 1958 Constitution, French legal texts can be any of four types: constitutional, treaty, parliamentary statutes, and at the bottom of the pyramid, governmental regulations and circulars. They are organized in a legal hierarchy, where norms of a lower level must obey the requirements of norms at a higher level. Each legal norm is created and derived its authority from a norm in the next level up in the hierarchy, and all authorities and lawmaking bodies must conform to these norms. This hierarchy is graphically represented as a pyramid, with the Constitutional block (France) at the top, followed by treaties and international agreements, which are above parliamentary legislation, and lastly, governmental regulations sitting at the bottom.

French sources reinterpret Kelsen's hierarchy metaphorically and graphically, calling it and depicting it as "Kelsen's pyramid" or "pyramid of norms", from the 1958 Constitution at the apex of the pyramid, and administrative decisions and contractual agreements between individuals at the foot. This hierarchical organization is one of the most important guarantees of the État du droit (Rechtstaat). The jurisdiction of different organisms of State are precisely defined within this framework, and the norms they promulgate are valid only insofar as they respect the higher-level norms which define and authorize their powers. Any organ failing to respect a higher-level principle is susceptible to judicial sanctions; this is known as the "principle of legality". The State, which has the power to define the law, is itself subject to this principle.

=== Foundation and research center ===
The Austrian federal government established a foundation bearing the name "Hans Kelsen-Institut" which became operational in 1972. Its task is to document the Pure Theory of Law and its dissemination in Austria and abroad, and to provide information about it and encourage it continuation and development. It produces a book series that has more than 30 volumes. The institute administers the rights to Kelsen's works and has edited several works from his unpublished papers, including General Theory of Norms (1979, translated 1991) and Secular Religion (2012, written in English).

The Hans Kelsen Research Center was established in 2006 in Germany at the University of Erlangen-Nuremberg, later moved to the University of Freiburg. The Institute and the Research Center are jointly publishing a historical-critical edition of Kelsen's works which is planned to reach more than 30 volumes; as of August 2023, the first eight volumes have been published by Mohr Siebeck.

== Criticism ==
Carl Schmitt's concept of "exception" was part of his authoritarian theories and placed him as a critic of Kelsen's positivist concept of normativism.

== See also ==
- Alfred Verdross
- Axiom
- Interpretivism (legal)
- Is–ought problem
- Jurisprudence
- Legal positivism
- Legal realism
- Metaethical relativism
- Moral anti-realism
- Moral realism
- Natural law
- Norm (philosophy)
- Normative jurisprudence
- Normative statement
- Normativity
- Philosophy of law
- Positive statement
- Rule of law

== Works cited ==
- d'Almeida, Luís Duarte; Gardner, John; Green, Leslie (2013). "Introduction". In d'Almeida, Luís Duarte; Gardner, John; Green, Leslie (eds.). Kelsen Revisited: New Essays on the Pure Theory of Law. Oxford: Hart Publishing. ISBN 9781849464567. OCLC 832313601.
- Baron, Frank (2018). "Qu'est-ce que l'État de droit ?" [What is the État de droit?]. Vie publique (in French). La Documentation française.
- Bindreiter, Uta (2002). Why Grundnorm?: A Treatise on the Implications of Kelsen's Doctrine. Springer Science & Business Media. pp. 11–. ISBN 978-90-411-1867-7. OCLC 1120367947.
- Green, Leslie (2019) [2003]. "Legal Positivism". In Zalta, Edward N. (ed.). Stanford Encyclopedia of Philosophy (Fall 2021 ed.). Stanford University. ISSN 1095-5054. OCLC 643092515.
- Kelsen, Hans (1967) [from Reine Rechtslehre, 1934:Franz Deuticke]. The Pure Theory of Law. Translated by Knight, Max. Berkeley: University of California Press. ISBN 9780520017559. LCCN 67-10234. OCLC 349106.
- Kelsen, Hans (1992) [1934]. Introduction to the Problems of Legal Theory: A Translation of the First Edition of the Reine Rechtslehre or Pure Theory of Law. Oxford Scholarship Online. Translated by Litschewski-Paulson, Bonnie; Paulson, Stanley L. Oxford: Clarendon Press. doi:10.1093/acprof:oso/9780198265658.001.0001. ISBN 9780198265658. OCLC 36529056.
- Kelsen, Hans (1961) [1945]. General Theory of Law and State. 20th century legal philosophy, #1. Translated by Wedberg, Anders. New York: Russell & Russell. OCLC 1087259718.
- Marmor, Andrei (2021). "The Pure Theory of Law". In Zalta, Edward N. (ed.). Stanford Encyclopedia of Philosophy (Fall 2021 ed.). Stanford University. ISSN 1095-5054. OCLC 643092515.
- Olechowski, Thomas (2018). "Legal Hierarchies in the Works of Hans Kelsen and Adolf Julius Merkl". In Müßig, Ulrike (ed.). Reconsidering Constitutional Formation II Decisive Constitutional Normativity. Studies in the History of Law and Justice, 12. Cham, CH: Springer. pp. 353–362. doi:10.1007/978-3-319-73037-0_9. ISBN 9783319730363. OCLC 7661964962.
- Olechowski, Thomas (2021). Biographie eines Rechtswissenschaftlers [Biography of a Legal Scientist] (pdf) (in German) (2nd revised ed.). Tübingen: Mohr Siebeck. ISBN 978-3-16-160205-4. OCLC 1246145816.
- Paulson, Stanley L. (1998). "Four Phases in Hans Kelsen's Legal Theory? Reflections on a Periodization. [Review of Carsten Heidemann, Die Norm als Tatsache. Zur Normentheorie Hans Kelsens]". Oxford Journal of Legal Studies. 18 (1). JSTOR 764726.
- Paulson, Stanley L. (1999). "Arriving at a Defensible Periodization of Hans Kelsen's Legal Theory". Oxford Journal of Legal Studies. 19 (2): 351–364. JSTOR 20468276.
- Scheuerman, William E. (2006). "Survey Article: Emergency Powers and the Rule of Law after 9/11". The Journal of Political Philosophy. 14 (1). John Wiley: 61–84. doi:10.1111/j.1467-9760.2006.00256.x.
- Spaak, Torben (2022). "Kelsen's Metaethics". Ratio Juris. 35 (2): 158–190. doi:10.1111/raju.12343. ISSN 0952-1917.
- Spaak, Torben; Mindus, Patricia (2021). The Cambridge Companion to Legal Positivism. Cambridge University Press. pp. 115–117.
- Steiner, Eva (2018). French Law: A Comparative Approach. OUP. ISBN 9780198790891. OCLC 1029737869.
- Stewart, Iain (1990). "The Critical Legal Science of Hans Kelsen". Journal of Law and Society. 17 (3). Wiley: 273–308. ISSN 0263-323X. JSTOR 1410155 – via TWL/Hein online.
- Vinx, Lars (2007). Hans Kelsen's Pure Theory of Law: Legality and Legitimacy. Oxford University Press. doi:10.1093/acprof:oso/9780199227952.001.0001. ISBN 9780199227952. OCLC 137312947. Archived from the original on 27 May 2023.
