= Hans Kelsen =

Austrian jurist and legal philosopher (1881–1973)

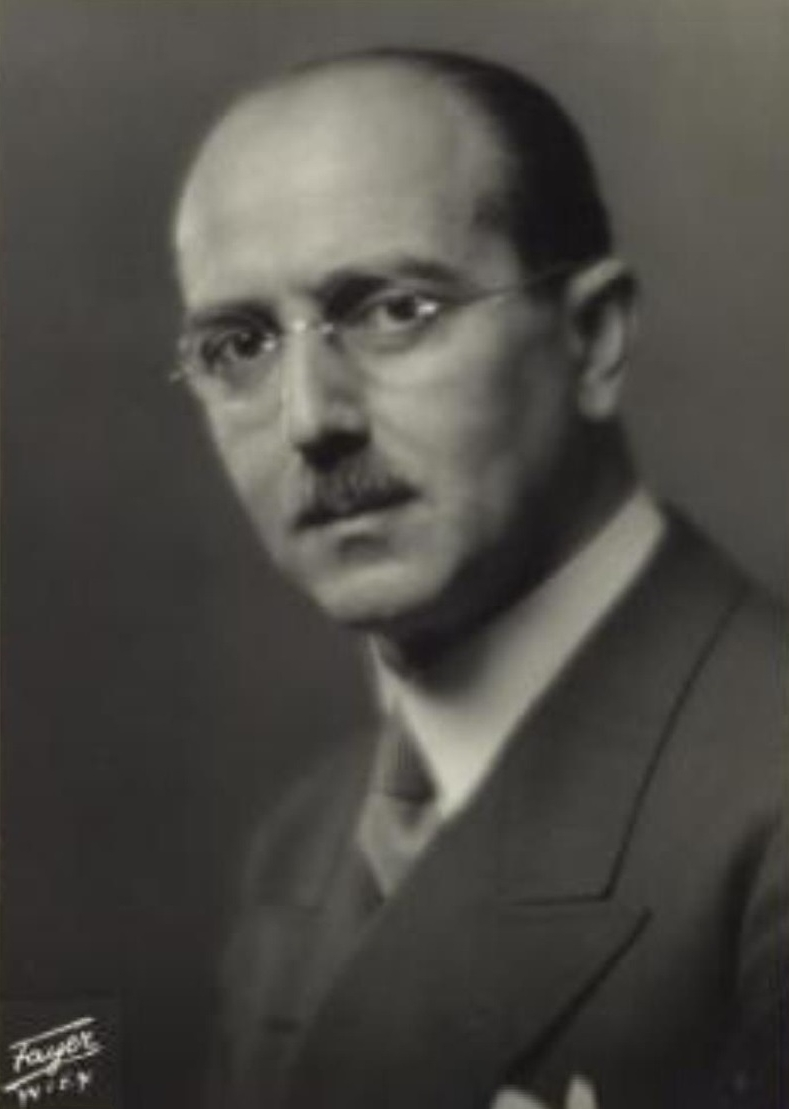
- Kelsen c. 1930
- Born: October 11, 1881; Prague, Austria-Hungary
- Died: April 19, 1973 (aged 91); Berkeley, California, U.S.

Education
- Education: University of Vienna (Dr. iur., 1906; habilitation, 1911)
- Thesis: Hauptprobleme der Staatsrechtslehre entwickelt aus der Lehre vom Rechtssätze (1911)

Philosophical work
- Era: 20th-century philosophy
- Region: Western philosophy
- School: Legal positivism
- Institutions: University of Vienna; University of Cologne; Graduate Institute of International and Development Studies; University of California, Berkeley
- Doctoral students: Eric Voegelin; Alfred Schütz
- Main interests: Public law International law Philosophy of law
- Notable ideas: Pure theory of law Basic norm Constitutional court

Hans Kelsen (/ˈkɛlsən/; German: [ˈhans ˈkɛlzən]; October 11, 1881 – April 19, 1973) was an Austrian and later American jurist, legal philosopher and political philosopher. He is known principally for his theory of law, which he named the "pure theory of law" (Reine Rechtslehre), and for his writings on international law and theory of democracy.

The "pure theory" provides general foundations for value-independent description of law. As an expert in constitutional law, Kelsen was the principal architect of the 1920 Austrian Constitution, which, with amendments, remains in force.

The rise of totalitarianism forced him out of Austria, then to Germany and to Switzerland and in 1940 to the United States. Although in 1934 Roscoe Pound lauded Kelsen as "unquestionably the leading jurist of the time", the pure theory was rarely understood in the United States and Kelsen was never given a permanent position in a law school.

He was employed in the department of politics at the University of California, Berkeley from 1942 until official retirement in 1952. He then rewrote his short book of 1934, titled Reine Rechtslehre, into a much enlarged "second edition" published in 1960; it appeared in an English translation in 1967.

== Biography ==
=== Early life ===
Kelsen was born in Prague into a middle-class, German-speaking, Jewish family. His father, Adolf Kelsen, was from Galicia, and his mother, Auguste Löwy, was from Bohemia. Hans was their first child; there were two younger brothers and a sister. The family moved to Vienna in 1884, when Hans was three years old. After graduating from the Akademisches Gymnasium, Kelsen studied law at the University of Vienna, taking his doctorate in law (Dr. juris) on 18 May 1906 and his habilitation (license to give university lectures) on 9 March 1911. Twice in his life, Kelsen converted to separate religious denominations. At the time of his dissertation on Dante and Catholicism, Kelsen was baptised as a Roman Catholic on 10 June 1905. On 25 May 1912 he married Margarete Bondi (1890–1973), the two having converted a few days earlier to Lutheranism of the Augsburg Confession; they had two daughters.

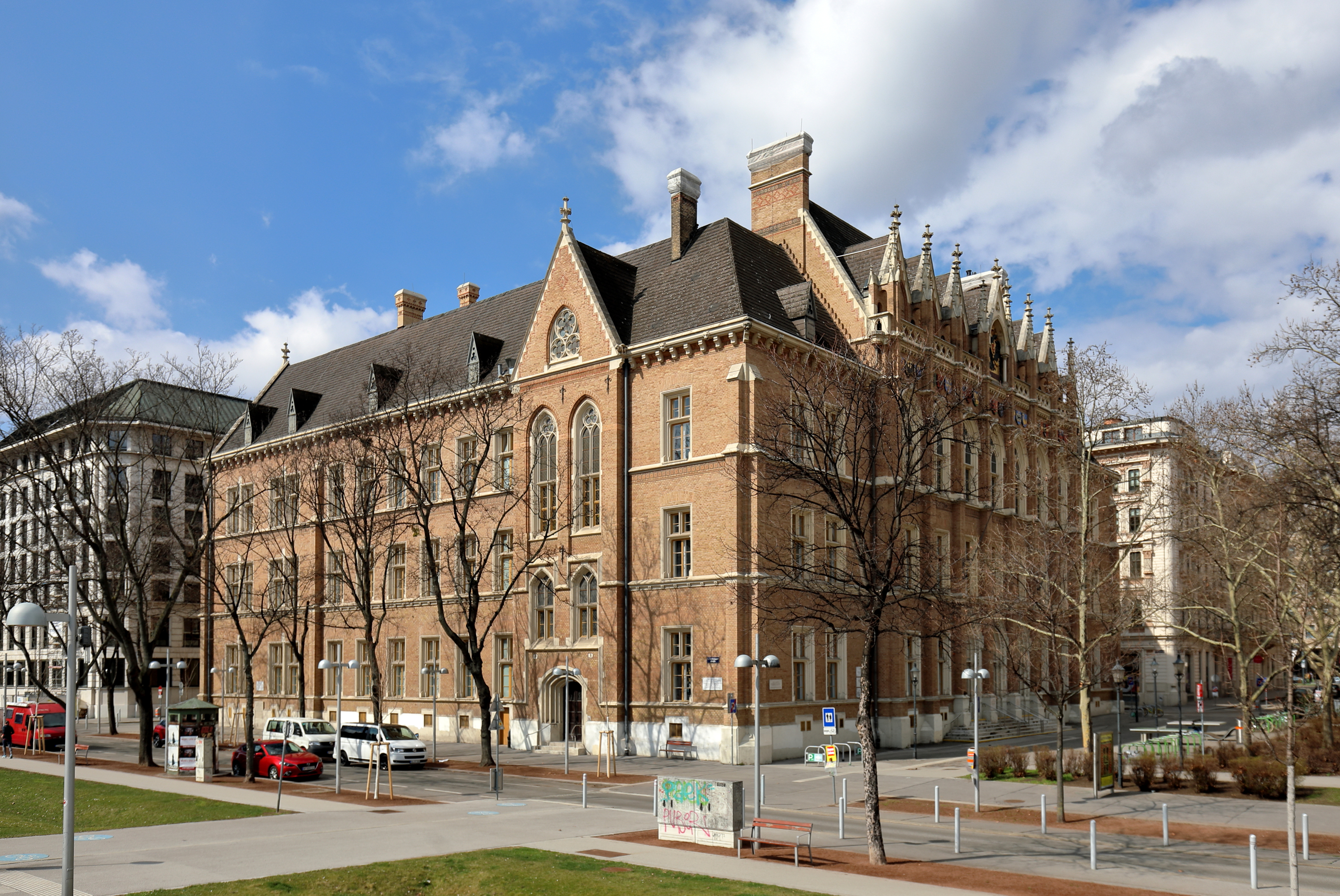
Akademisches Gymnasium in Vienna, where Kelsen received his secondary education.

=== Kelsen and his years in Austria up to 1930 ===
Kelsen's early work on Dante's theory of the state in 1905 became his first book on political theory. The study makes a rigorous examination of the "two swords doctrine" of Pope Gelasius I, along with Dante's distinct sentiments in the Roman Catholic debates between the Guelphs and Ghibellines. Kelsen's conversion to Catholicism was contemporaneous to the book's completion in 1905. He obtained the degree of Dr. Juris (doctor of law) by examination in 1906. In 1908, studying for his habilitation, Kelsen won a research scholarship which allowed him to attend the University of Heidelberg for three consecutive semesters, where he studied with the distinguished jurist Georg Jellinek before returning to Vienna.

The closing chapter of Kelsen's study of political allegory in Dante also was important for emphasizing the particular historical path which led directly to the development of modern law in the twentieth century. After emphasizing Dante's importance to this development of legal theory, Kelsen then indicated the historical importance of Niccolò Machiavelli and Jean Bodin to these historical transitions in legal theory leading to modern twentieth century law. In the case of Machiavelli, Kelsen saw an important counter-example of an exaggerated executive part of government operating without effective legal restraints on responsible conduct. For Kelsen, this was instrumental in the orientation of his own legal thinking in the direction of government strictly according to law, eventually with a heightened emphasis on the importance of a fully elaborated power of judicial review.

Kelsen's time at Heidelberg was of lasting importance to him in that he began to solidify his position of the identity of law and state from the initial steps he observed as being taken by Jellinek. Kelsen's historical reality was to be surrounded by the dualistic theories of law and state prevailing in his time. The major question for Jellinek and Kelsen, as stated by Baume is, "How can the independence of the state in a dualist perspective be reconciled with its status (as) representative of the legal order? For dualistic theorists there remains an alternative to monistic doctrines: the theory of the self-limitation of the state. Georg Jellinek is an eminent representative of this theory, which allows one to avoid reducing the state to a legal entity, and also to explain the positive relationship between law and state. The self-limitation of the sphere of the state presupposes that the state, as a sovereign power, by the limits that it imposes on itself, becomes a rule-of-law state." For Kelsen, this was appropriate for as far as it went yet it still remained a dualistic doctrine and therefore Kelsen rejected it stating: "The problem of the so-called auto-obligation of the State is one of those pseudo-problems that result from the erroneous dualism of State and law. This dualism is, in turn, due to a fallacy of which we meet numerous examples in the history of all fields of human thought. Our desire for the intuitive representation of abstractions leads us to personify the unity of a system, and then to hypostasize the personification. What originally was only a way of representing the unity of a system of objects becomes a new object, existing in its own right." Kelsen was joined in this critique by the distinguished French jurist Léon Duguit, who wrote in 1911: "Self-limitation theory (vis Jellinek) contains some real sleight of hand. Voluntary subordination is not subordination. The state is not really limited by the law if the state alone can introduce and write this law, and if it can at any time make any changes that it wants to make in it. This kind of foundation of public law is clearly extremely fragile." As a result, Kelsen solidified his position endorsing the doctrine of the identity of law and state.

In 1911, he achieved his habilitation in public law and legal philosophy, with a thesis that became his first major work on legal theory, Hauptprobleme der Staatsrechtslehre entwickelt aus der Lehre vom Rechtssatze ("Main Problems in Theory of Public Law, Developed from Theory of the Legal Statement"). In 1919, he became full professor of public and administrative law at the University of Vienna, where he established and edited the Zeitschrift für öffentliches Recht (Journal of Public Law). At the behest of Chancellor Karl Renner, Kelsen worked on drafting a new Austrian Constitution, enacted in 1920. The document still forms the basis of Austrian constitutional law. Kelsen was appointed to the Constitutional Court, for his lifetime. Kelsen's emphasis during these years upon a Continental form of legal positivism began to further flourish from the standpoint of his law-state monism, somewhat based upon the previous examples of Continental legal positivism found in such scholars of law-state dualism such as Paul Laband (1838–1918) and Carl Friedrich von Gerber (1823–1891).

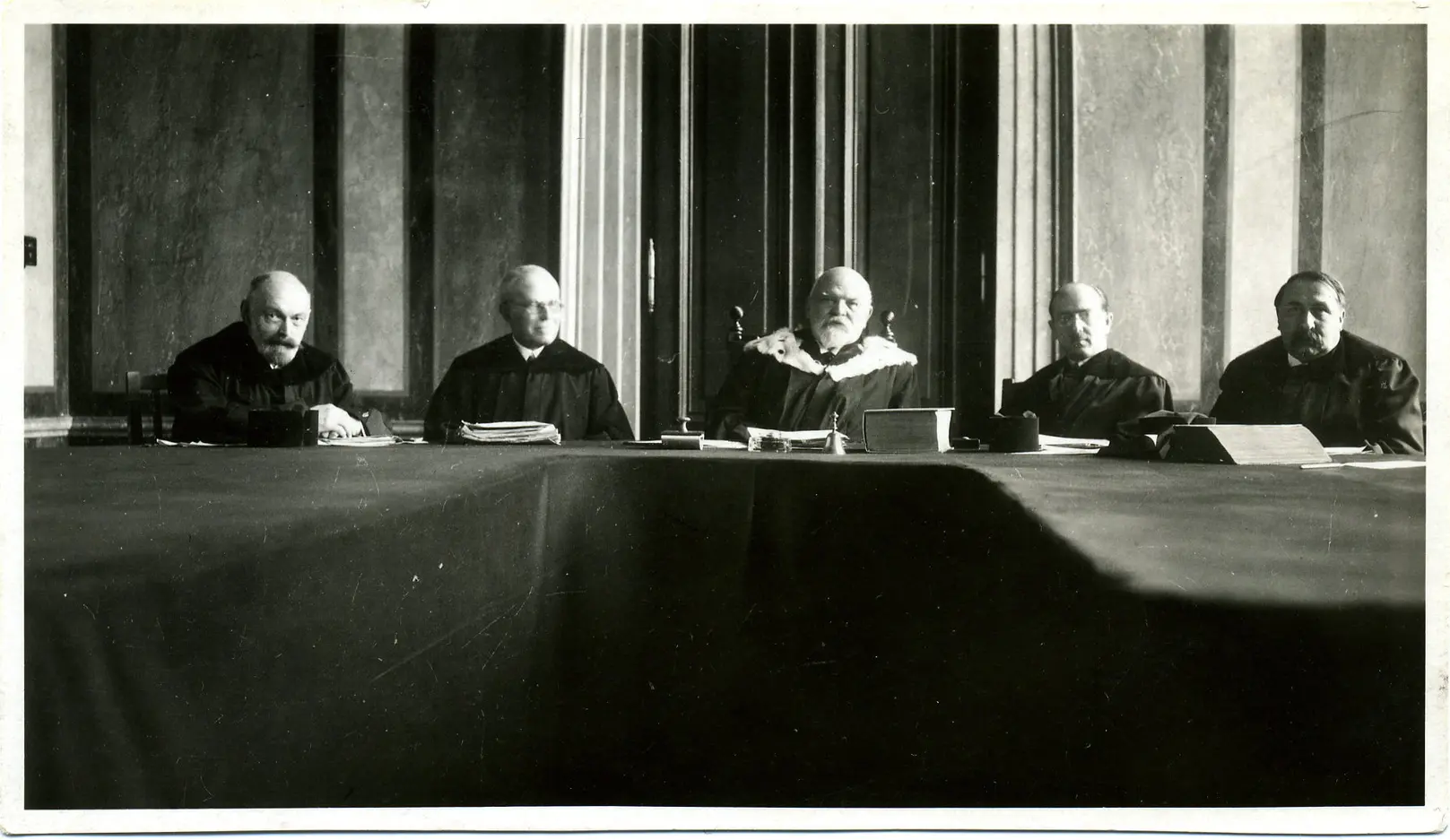
Session of the Constitutional Court of Austria, around 1925. President Paul Vittorelli sits in the middle; Hans Kelsen is second from the right.

During the early 1920s he published six major works in the areas of government, public law, and international law: in 1920, Das Problem der Souveränität und die Theorie des Völkerrechts (The Problem of Sovereignty and Theory of International Law) and Vom Wesen und Wert der Demokratie (On the Essence and Value of Democracy); in 1922, Der soziologische und der juristische Staatsbegriff (The Sociological and Juristic Concepts of the State); in 1923, Österreichisches Staatsrecht (Austrian Public Law); and, in 1925, Allgemeine Staatslehre (General Theory of the State), together with Das Problem des Parlamentarismus (The Problem of Parliamentarianism). In the late 1920s, these were followed by Die philosophischen Grundlagen der Naturrechtslehre und des Rechtspositivismus (The Philosophical Foundations of the Doctrine of Natural Law and Legal Positivism).

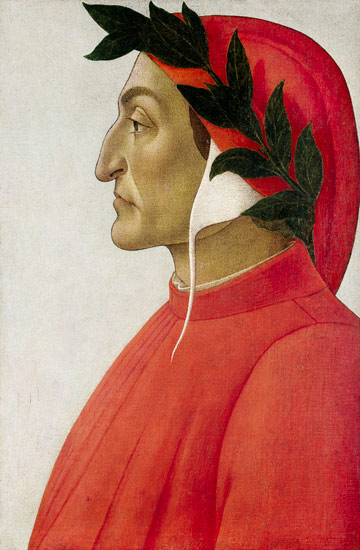
Kelsen's 1905 book was about political allegory in Dante Alighieri (oil by Botticelli).

During the 1920s, Kelsen continued to promote his celebrated theory of the identity of law and state which made his efforts a counterpoint to the position of Carl Schmitt who advocated for the priority of the political concerns of the state. Kelsen was supported in his position by Adolf Merkl and Alfred Verdross, while opposition to his view was voiced by Erich Kaufman, Hermann Heller, and Rudolf Smend. An important part of Kelsen's main practical legacy is as the inventor of the modern European model of constitutional review. This was first introduced in both Austria and Czechoslovakia in 1920, and later in the Federal Republic of Germany, Italy, Spain, Portugal, as well as in many countries of Central and Eastern Europe.

As described above, the Kelsenian court model set up a separate constitutional court which was to have sole responsibility over constitutional disputes within the judicial system. Kelsen was the primary author of its statutes in the state constitution of Austria as he documents in his 1923 book cited above. This is different from the system usual in common-law countries, including the United States, in which courts of general jurisdiction from the trial level up to the court of last resort frequently have powers of constitutional review. Following increasing political controversy about some positions of the Constitutional Court of Austria, Kelsen faced increasing pressure from the administration which appointed him to specifically address issues and cases concerning the providence of divorce provisions in state family law. Kelsen was inclined to a liberal interpretation of the divorce provision while the administration which had originally appointed him was responding to public pressure for the predominantly Catholic country to take a more conservative position on the issue of the curtailment of divorce. In this increasingly conservative climate, Kelsen, who was considered sympathetic to the Social Democrats, although not a party member, was removed from the court in 1930.

=== Kelsen and his European years between 1930 and 1940 ===
Sandrine Baume has summarized the confrontation between Kelsen and Schmitt at the very start of the 1930s. This debate was to reignite Kelsen's strong defense of the principle of judicial review against the principle of an authoritarian version of the executive branch of government which Schmitt had envisioned for national socialism in Germany. Kelsen wrote his scathing reply to Schmitt in his 1931 essay, "Who Should Be the Guardian of the Constitution?", in which he defended in plain terms the importance of judicial review over and against the excessive form of executive authoritarian government which Schmitt was promulgating in the early 1930s. As Baume states,

"Kelsen defended the legitimacy of the constitutional court by combating the reasons that Schmitt cites for assigning the role of the guardian of the Constitution to the President of the Reich. The dispute between these two lawyers was about which body of the state should be assigned the role of guardian of the German Constitution. Kelsen thought that this mission ought to be conferred on the judiciary, especially the Constitutional Court."

Although Kelsen was successful in drafting sections for the Constitution in Austria for a strong court of judicial review, his sympathizers in Germany were less successful. Both Heinrich Triepel in 1924 and Gerhard Anschütz in 1926 were unsuccessful in their explicit drive to instill a strong version of judicial review in Germany's Weimar Constitution. The complete set of the articles published in the debate between Kelsen and Schmitt during the 1930s has been collected by Lars Vinx and published in English translation in 2015.

Kelsen accepted a professorship at the University of Cologne in 1930. When the National Socialists came to power in Germany in 1933, he was removed from his post. He relocated to Geneva, Switzerland where he taught international law at the Graduate Institute of International Studies from 1934 to 1940. During this time period, Hans Morgenthau departed from Germany to complete his habilitation dissertation in Geneva, which resulted in his book The Reality of Norms and in particular the Norms of International Law: Foundations of a Theory of Norms. By remarkable good fortune for Morgenthau, Kelsen had just arrived in Geneva as a professor and he became an adviser for Morgenthau's dissertation. Kelsen was among the strongest critics of Carl Schmitt because Schmitt was advocating for the priority of the political concerns of the state over the adherence by the state to the rule of law. Kelsen and Morgenthau were united against this National Socialist school of political interpretation which down-played the rule of law, and they became lifelong colleagues even after both had emigrated from Europe to take their respective academic positions in the United States. During these years, Kelsen and Morgenthau had both become persona non grata in Germany during the full rise to power of National Socialism.

That Kelsen was the principal defender of Morgenthau's Habilitationschrift is recently documented in the translation of Morgenthau's book titled The Concept of the Political. In the introductory essay to the volume, Behr and Rosch indicate that the Geneva faculty under the examiners Walther Burckhardt and Paul Guggenheim were initially quite negative concerning Morgenthau's Habilitationschrift. When Morgenthau had found a Paris publisher for the volume, he asked Kelsen to re-evaluate it. In the words of Behr and Rosch, "Kelsen was the right choice to assess Morgenthau's thesis because not only was he a senior scholar in Staatslehre, but Morgenthau's thesis was also largely a critical examination of Kelsen's legal positivism. Thus, it was Kelsen to whom Morgenthau 'owed his Habilitation in Geneva,' as Kelsen's biographer Rudolf Aladár Métall confirms, and also eventually his subsequent academic career, because Kelsen produced the positive evaluation that convinced the board of examiners to award Morgenthau his Habilitation."

In 1934, at the age of 52, he published the first edition of Reine Rechtslehre (Pure Theory of Law). While in Geneva he became more deeply interested in international law. This interest in international law in Kelsen was in reaction largely to the Kellogg–Briand Pact in 1929 and his negative reaction to the vast idealism he saw represented in its pages, along with the lack of the recognition of sanctions for the illicit actions of belligerent states. Kelsen had come to endorse strongly the sanction-delict theory of law which he saw as substantially under-represented in the Kellogg–Briand Pact. In 1936–1938 he was briefly professor at the German University in Prague before returning to Geneva where he remained until 1940. His interest in international law became especially focused in Kelsen's writings on international war crimes which he redoubled his efforts on behalf of after his departure to the United States.

=== Hans Kelsen and his American years after 1940 ===
In 1940, at the age of 58, he and his family fled Europe on the last voyage of the SS Washington, embarking on 1 June in Lisbon. He moved to the United States, giving the prestigious Oliver Wendell Holmes Lectures at Harvard Law School in 1942. He was supported by Roscoe Pound for a faculty position at Harvard but opposed by Lon Fuller on the Harvard faculty before becoming a full professor at the department of political science at the University of California, Berkeley in 1945. Kelsen was defending a position of the distinction of the philosophical definition of justice as it is separable from the application of positive law. As Fuller stated his opposition, "I share the opinion of Jerome Hall, evidenced in this excellent Readings, that jurisprudence should start with justice. I place this preference not on exhortatory grounds, but on a belief that until one has wrestled with the problem of justice one cannot truly understand the other issues of jurisprudence. Kelsen, for example, excludes justice from his studies (of practical law) because it is an 'irrational ideal' and therefore 'not subject to cognition.' The whole structure of his theory derives from that exclusion. The meaning of his theory can therefore be understood only when we have subjected to critical scrutiny its keystone of negation." Lon Fuller felt that the natural law position he was advocating against Kelsen was incompatible with Kelsen's dedication to the responsible use of positive law and the science of law. During the ensuing years, Kelsen increasingly dealt with issues of international law and international institutions such as the United Nations. In 1953-54, he was visiting Professor of International Law at the United States Naval War College.

Another part of Kelsen's practical legacy, as he has recorded, was the influence that his writings from the 1930s and early 1940s had upon the extensive and unprecedented prosecution of political leaders and military leaders at the end of WWII at Nuremberg and Tokyo, producing convictions in more than one thousand war crimes cases. For Kelsen, the trials were the culmination of approximately fifteen years of research he had devoted to this topic, which started still in his European years, and which he followed with his celebrated essay, "Will the Judgment In the Nuremberg Trial Constitute a Precedent In International Law?," published in The International Law Quarterly in 1947. It was preceded in 1943 by Kelsen's essay, 'Collective and Individual Responsibility in International Law with Particular Regard to Punishment of War Criminals', 31 California Law Review, p 530, and in 1944 by his essay, "The Rule Against Ex Post Facto and the Prosecution of the Axis War Criminals," which appeared in The Judge Advocate Journal, Issue 8.

In Kelsen's companion 1948 essay for J.Y.B.I.L. to his 1943 "War Criminals" essay cited in the above paragraph titled, "Collective and Individual Responsibility for Acts of State in International Law," Kelsen presented his thoughts on the distinction between the doctrine of respondeat superior and the acts of State doctrine when used as a defense during the prosecution of war crimes. On page 228 of the essay Kelsen states that, "Acts of State are acts of individuals performed by them in their capacity as organs of the State, especially by that organ which is called the Government of the State. These acts are performed by individuals who belong to the Government as the head of State, or members of the cabinet, or are acts performed at its command or with the authorization of the Government." Yoram Dinstein of Hebrew University in Jerusalem has taken exception to Kelsen's formulation in his book The Defense of 'Obedience to Superior Orders' in International Law, reprinted in 2012 by Oxford University Press, dealing with Kelsen's specific attribution of acts of State.

Shortly after the initiation of the drafting of the UN Charter on 25 April 1945 in San Francisco, Kelsen began the writing of his extended 700-page treatise on the United Nations as a newly appointed professor at the University of California at Berkeley (The Law of the United Nations, New York 1950). In 1952, he also published his book-length study about international law entitled Principles of International Law in English, and reprinted in 1966. In 1955, Kelsen turned to a 100-page essay, "Foundations of Democracy," for the leading philosophy journal Ethics; written during the height of Cold War tensions, it expressed a passionate commitment to the Western model of democracy over soviet and national-socialist forms of government.

This 1955 essay by Kelsen on democracy was also important for summarizing his critical stance towards the 1954 book on politics by his former student in Europe Eric Voegelin. Following this, in Kelsen's book entitled A New Science of Politics (Ontos Verlag, reprinted in 2005, 140pp, originally published 1956), Kelsen enumerated a point by point criticism of the excessive idealism and ideology which he saw as prevailing in Voegelin's book on politics. This exchange and debate has been documented in the appendix to the book, written by the author on Voegelin, Barry Cooper, entitled Voegelin and the Foundations of Modern Political Science from 1999. Kelsen's 1956 book was followed in 1957 by a collection of essays on justice, law and politics, most of them previously published in English.

Some mystery surrounds the belated publication, in 2012, of Kelsen's Secular Religion. The text was begun in the 1950s, as an attack on work by his former pupil Eric Voegelin. In the early 1960s an expanded version was set up in proof but was withdrawn at Kelsen's insistence (and considerable personal expense in reimbursing the publisher), for reasons that have never become clear. However, the Hans Kelsen Institute eventually decided that it should be published. It is a vigorous defense of modern science against all, including Voegelin, who wished to overturn the accomplishments of the Enlightenment by demanding that science be guided by religion. Kelsen seeks to expose contradictions in their claim that modern science, after all, rests upon the same sorts of assumption as religion—that it constitutes forms of "new religion" and so should not complain when old religion is brought back in.

== The Pure Theory of Law ==
Kelsen is considered one of the preeminent jurists of the 20th century and has been highly influential among scholars of jurisprudence and public law, especially in Europe and Latin America although less so in common-law countries.

Kelsen's theory of law, his 'Pure Theory of Law' (Reine Rechtslehre), aims to describe law as a hierarchy of binding norms, while refusing, itself, to evaluate those norms. That is, 'legal science' is to be separated from 'legal politics'. Central to the Pure Theory is the notion of a 'basic norm' (Grundnorm)—a hypothetical norm, presupposed by the theory, from which in a hierarchy of empowerments all 'lower' norms in a legal system, from constitutional law downward, are understood to derive their validity, hence their authority or 'bindingness'. This is not logical validity (i.e. of deduction), but 'legal validity'; a norm is legally 'valid' if and only if the organ creating it has been so empowered by a higher norm. Public international law is understood as similarly hierarchical. In this way, Kelsen contends, the validity of legal norms (their specifically 'legal' character) can be understood without tracing it ultimately to some suprahuman source such as God, personified Nature or a personified State or Nation. The Pure Theory is intended as rigorous legal positivism, excluding any idea of natural law.

Kelsen's main statement of his theory, his book Reine Rechtslehre, was published in two editions, far apart: in 1934, while he was in exile in Geneva, and a second, much expanded edition after he had formally retired from the University of California, Berkeley. The second edition appeared in English translation in 1967, as Pure Theory of Law. The current translation of the second edition, in omitting many footnotes, obscures the extent to which the Pure Theory is both philosophically grounded and responsive to earlier theories of law; a new translation is in preparation.

Kelsen wrote primarily in German, as well as in French and in English. His complete works are being published, both in hard copy and online, as the Hans Kelsen Werke, planned to run to 32 volumes with completion in 2042.

== Kelsen's widespread contributions to legal theory ==
Kelsen's theory both drew from and has been developed by scholars in his homelands, notably the Vienna School in Austria and the Brno School led by František Weyr in Czechoslovakia. It is stated that in the English-speaking world, and notably the "Oxford school" of jurisprudence, Kelsen's influence can be seen particularly in the work of H. L. A. Hart, John Gardner, Leslie Green, and Joseph Raz, and "in the backhanded compliment of strenuous criticism, also in the work of John Finnis". Among the principal other writers in English on Kelsen are Robert S. Summers, Neil MacCormick and Stanley L. Paulson. Among Kelsen's principal critics today is Joseph Raz, who has excoriated the reading of Nuremberg and the war crimes trials which Kelsen had interpreted in a consistent manner throughout the 1930s and 1940s.

Hans Kelsen established the principles of judicial review in the Constitutions of Austria and Czechoslovakia following the example of John Marshall in the American Constitutional experience.

Four major areas of Kelsen's contributions to legal theory over his lifetime included the following areas of (i) judicial review, (ii) hierarchical law, (iii) the de-ideologicalization of positive law to strongly disassociate all reference to natural law, and (iv) the clear delineation of the science of law and legal science in twentieth century modern law.

=== Judicial review ===
Judicial review for Kelsen in the twentieth century was part of a tradition inherited from the common law tradition based upon the American constitutional experience as introduced by John Marshall. By the time the principle had reached Europe and specifically Kelsen, the issue of the codification of Marshall's common law version of judicial review into its form of constitutionally legislated law became an explicit theme for Kelsen. In drafting the constitutions for both Austria and Czechoslovakia, Kelsen chose to carefully delineate and limit the domain of judicial review to a narrower focus than was originally accommodated by John Marshall. Kelsen did receive a lifetime appointment to the court of judicial review in Austria and remained on this court for almost an entire decade during the 1920s.

=== Hierarchical law ===
Hierarchical law as a model for understanding the structural description of the process of understanding and applying the law (Stufenbau) was central for Kelsen and he adopted the model directly from his colleague Adolf Merkl at the University of Vienna. The main purpose of the hierarchical description of the law was three-fold for Kelsen. First, it was essential to understanding his celebrated static theory of law as elaborated in Chapter four of his book on the Pure Theory of Law (see subsection above). In its second edition, this chapter on the static theory of the law was almost one hundred pages in length and represented a comprehensive study of law capable of standing as an independent subject for research for legal scholars in this area of specialization. Second, it was a measure of relative centralization or decentralization. Third, a fully centralized system of law would also correspond to a unique Grundnorm or basic norm which would not be inferior to any other norm in the hierarchy due to its placement at the utmost foundation of the hierarchy (see Grundnorm section below).

=== The de-ideologicalization of positive law ===
Kelsen, during the time period of his education and legal training in fin-de-siecle Europe, had inherited a highly ambiguous definition of natural law which could be presented as having metaphysical, theological, philosophical, political, religious, or ideological components depending on any one of numerous sources who might desire to utilize the term. For Kelsen, this ambiguity in the definition of natural made it unusable in any practical sense for a modern approach to understanding the science of law. Kelsen explicitly defined positive law to deal with the many ambiguities he associated with the use of natural law in his time, along with the negative influence which it had upon the reception of what was meant even by positive law in contexts apparently removed from the domain of influence normally associated with natural law.

=== Science of law ===
The redefinition of the science of law and legal science to meet the requirements of modern law in the twentieth century was of significant concern to Kelsen. Kelsen wrote book-length studies detailing the many distinctions to be made between the natural sciences and their associated methodology of causal reasoning in contrast to methodology of normative reasoning which he saw as more directly suited to the legal sciences. The science of law and legal science were key methodological distinctions which were of high importance to Kelsen in the development of the pure theory of law and the general project of removing ambiguous ideological elements from having undue influence on the development of modern twentieth century law. In his last years, Kelsen turned to a comprehensive presentation of his ideas on norms. The unfinished manuscript was published posthumously as Allgemeine Theorie der Normen (General Theory of Norms).

== Political philosophy ==
Kelsen's very first book (see Section above) was written about the political philosophy of Dante Alighieri and it was only with his second book that Kelsen started to write book length studies about the philosophy of law and its practical applications. Baume speaks of Kelsen's political philosophy concerning judicial review as coming closest to Ronald Dworkin and John Hart Ely among the scholars active after the end of Kelsen's life.

As summarized by Sandrine Baume, "In 1927 [Kelsen] recognized his debt to Kantianism on this methodological point that determined much of his pure theory of law: 'Purity of method, indispensable to legal science, did not seem to me to be guaranteed by any philosopher as sharply as by Kant with his contrast between Is and Ought. Thus for me, Kantian philosophy was from the very outset the light that guided me.'" Kelsen's high praise of Kant in the absence of any specific neo-Kantians is matched among more recent scholars by John Rawls of Harvard University. Both Kelsen and Rawls also have made strong endorsements of Kant's books on Perpetual Peace (1795) and Idea for a Universal History (1784). In his book titled What is Justice?, Kelsen indicated his position concerning social justice stating, "[S]uppose that it is possible to prove that the economic situation of a people can be improved so essentially by so-called planned economy that social security is guaranteed to everybody in an equal measure; but that such an organization is possible only if all individual freedom is abolished. The answer to the question whether planned economy is preferable to free economy depends on our decision between the values of individual freedom and social security. Hence, to the question of whether individual freedom is a higher value than social security or vice versa, only a subjective answer is possible,"

Five principal areas of concern for Kelsen in the area of political philosophy can be identified among his many interests for their centrality and the effect which they exerted over virtually his entire lifetime. These are; (i) Sovereignty, (ii) Law-state identity theory, (iii) State-society dualism, (iv) Centralization-decentralization, and (v) Dynamic theory of law.

=== Sovereignty ===
The definition and redefinition of sovereignty for Kelsen in the context of twentieth century modern law became a central theme for the political philosophy of Hans Kelsen from 1920 to the end of his life. The sovereignty of the state defines the domain of jurisdiction for the laws which govern the state and its associated society. The principles of explicitly defined sovereignty became of increasing importance to Kelsen as the domain of his concerns extended more comprehensively into international law and its manifold implications following the conclusion of WWI. The very regulation of international law in the presence of asserted sovereign borders either presented a major barrier for Kelsen in the application of principles in international law, or represented areas where the mitigation of sovereignty could greatly facilitate the progress and effectiveness of international law in geopolitics.

=== Law–state identity theory ===
The understanding of Kelsen's highly functional reading of the identity of law and state continues to represent one of the most challenging barriers to students and researchers of law approaching Kelsen's writings for the first time. After Kelsen completed his doctoral dissertation on the political philosophy of Dante, he turned to the study of Jellinek's dualist theory of law and state in Heidelberg in the years leading to 1910. Kelsen found that although he had a high respect for Jellinek as a leading scholar of his day, that Jellinek endorsement of a dualist theory of law and state was an impediment to the further development of a legal science which would be supportive of the development of responsible law throughout the twentieth century in addressing the requirements of the new century for the regulation of its society and of its culture. Kelsen's highly functional reading of the state was the most compatible manner he could locate for allowing for the development of positive law in a manner compatible with the demands of twentieth century geopolitics.

=== State–society distinctions and delineations ===
After accepting the need for endorsing an explicit reading of the identity of law and state, Kelsen remained equally sensitive to recognizing the need for society to nonetheless express tolerance and even encourage the discussion and debate of philosophy, sociology, theology, metaphysics, politics, and religion. Culture and society were to be regulated by the state according to legislative and constitutional norms. Kelsen recognized the province of society in an extensive sense which would allow for the discussion of religion, natural law, metaphysics, the arts, etc., for the development of culture in its many and varied attributes. Very significantly, Kelsen came to the strong inclination in his writings that the discussion of justice, as one example, was appropriate to the domain of society and culture, though its dissemination within the law was highly narrow and dubious. A twentieth century version of modern law, for Kelsen, would need to very carefully and appropriately delineate the responsible discussion of philosophical justice if the science of law was to be allowed to progress in an effective manner responding to the geopolitical and domestic needs of the new century.

=== Centralization and decentralization ===
A common theme which was unavoidable for Kelsen within the many applications he encountered of his political philosophy was that of centralization and decentralization. For Kelsen, centralization was a philosophically key position to the understanding of the pure theory of law. The pure theory of law is in many ways dependent upon the logical regress of its hierarchy of superior and inferior norms reaching a centralized point of origination in the hierarchy which he termed the basic norm, or Grundnorm. In Kelsen's general assessments, centralization was to often be associated with more modern and highly developed forms of enhancements and improvements to sociological and cultural norms, while the presence of decentralization was a measure of more primitive and less sophisticated observations concerning sociological and cultural norms.

=== Dynamic theory of law ===
The dynamic theory of law is singled out in this subsection discussing the political philosophy of Hans Kelsen for the very same reasons which Kelsen applied in separating its explication from the discussion of the static theory of law within the pages of Pure Theory of Law. The dynamic theory of law is the explicit and very acutely defined mechanism of state by which the process of legislation allows for new law to be created, and already established laws to be revised, as a result of political debate in the sociological and cultural domains of activity. Kelsen devotes one of his longest chapters in the revised version of Pure Theory of Law to discussing the central importance he associated with the dynamic theory of law. Its length of nearly one hundred pages is suggestive of its central significance to the book as a whole and may almost be studied as an independent book in its own right complementing the other themes which Kelsen covers in this book.

== Reception and criticism ==
This section delineates the reception and criticism of Kelsen's writings and research throughout his lifetime. It also explicates the reaction of his scholarly reception after his death in 1973 concerning his intellectual legacy. Throughout his lifetime, Kelsen maintained a highly authoritative position representing his wide range of contributions to the theory and practice of law. Few scholars in the study of law were able to match his ability to engage and often polarize legal opinion during his own lifetime and extending well into his legacy reception after his death. One significant example of this involves his introduction and development of the term Grundnorm which can be briefly summarized to illustrate the diverse responses which his opinion was able to often stimulate in the legal community of his time. The short version of its reception is illustrative of many similar debates with which Kelsen was involved at many points in his career and may be summarized as follows.

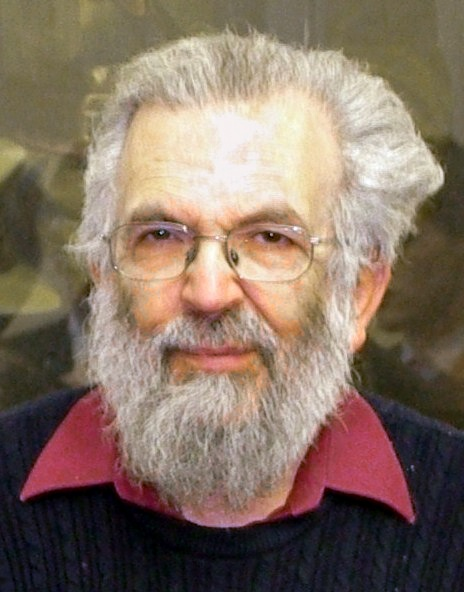
Kelsen's defense of the Nuremberg war crime trials received explicit criticism by Joseph Raz in recent years.

=== The Grundnorm ===
Regarding Kelsen's original use of the term Grundnorm, its closest antecedent appears in writings of his colleague Adolf Merkl at the University of Vienna. Merkl was developing a structural research approach for the understanding of law as a matter of the hierarchical relationship of norms, largely on the basis of their being either superior, the one to the other, or inferior with respect to each other. Kelsen adapted and assimilated much of Merkl's approach into his own presentation of the Pure Theory of Law in both its original version (1934) and its revised version (1960). For Kelsen, the importance of the Grundnorm was in large measure two-fold since it importantly indicated the logical regress of superior relationships between norms as they led to the norm which ultimately would have no other norm to which it was inferior. Its second feature was that it represented the importance which Kelsen associated with the concept of a fully centralized legal order in contrast to the existence of decentralized forms of government and representing legal orders.

Another form of the reception of the term originated from the fairly extended attempt to read Kelsen as a neo-Kantian following his early engagement with Hermann Cohen's work in 1911, the year his Habilitation dissertation on public law was published. Cohen was a leading neo-Kantian of the time and Kelsen was, in his own way, receptive to many of the ideas which Cohen had expressed in his published book review of Kelsen's writing. Kelsen had insisted that he had never used this material in the actual writing of his own book, though Cohen's ideas were attractive to him in their own right. This has resulted in one of the longest-running debates within the general Kelsen community as to whether Kelsen became a neo-Kantian himself after the encounter with Cohen's work, or if he managed to keep his own non-neo-Kantian position intact which he claimed was the prevailing circumstance when he first wrote his book in 1911.

The neo-Kantians, when pressing the issue, would lead Kelsen into discussions concerning whether the existence of such a Grundnorm was strictly symbolic or whether it had a concrete foundation. This has led to the further division within this debate concerning the currency of the term Grundnorm as to whether it should be read, on the one hand, as part and parcel of Hans Vaihinger's "as-if" hypothetical construction. On the other hand, to those seeking a practical reading, the Grundnorm corresponded to something directly and concretely comparable to a sovereign nation's federal constitution, under which would be organized all of its regional and local laws, and no law would be recognized as being superior to it.

In different contexts, Kelsen would indicate his preferences in different ways, with some neo-Kantians asserting that late in life Kelsen largely abided by the symbolic reading of the term when used in the neo-Kantian context, and as he has documented. The neo-Kantian reading of Kelsen can further be subdivided into three subgroups, with each representing their own preferred reading of the meaning of the Grundnorm, which were identifiable as (a) the Marburg neo-Kantians, (b) the Baden neo-Kantians, and (c) his own Kelsenian reading of the neo-Kantian school (during his "analytico-linguistic" phase circa 1911–1915) with which his writings on this subject are often associated.

=== Reception during Kelsen's European years ===
This section covers Kelsen's years in Austria, Germany, Czechoslovakia and Switzerland. While still in Austria, Kelsen entered the debate on the versions of Public Law prevailing in his time by engaging the predominating opinions of Jellinek and Gerber in his 1911 Habilitation dissertation (see description above). Kelsen, after attending Jellinek's lectures in Heidelberg oriented his interpretation according to the need to extend Jellinek's research past the points which Jellinek had set as its limits. For Kelsen, the effective operation of a legal order required that it be separated from political influences in terms which exceeded substantially the terms which Jellinek had adopted as its preferred form. In response to his 1911 dissertation, Kelsen was challenged by the neo-Kantians, originally led by Hermann Cohen, who maintained that there were substantial neo-Kantian insights which were open to Kelsen, which Kelsen himself did not appear to develop to the full extent of their potential interpretation as summarized in the section above. Sara Lagi in her book on Kelsen and his 1920s writings on democracy has articulated the revised and guarded reception of Jellinek by Kelsen. Kelsen was the principal author of the passages for the incorporation of judicial review in the Constitutions of Austria and Czechoslovakia during the 1910s largely on the model of John Marshall and the American Constitutional experience.

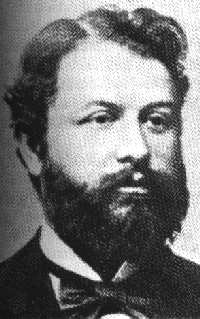
Georg Jellinek, whose 'two sides' theory of law and state Kelsen overturned.

In addition to this debate, Kelsen had initiated a separate discussion with Carl Schmitt on questions relating to the definition of sovereignty and its interpretation in international law. Kelsen became deeply committed to the principle of the adherence of the state to the rule of law above political controversy, while Schmitt adhered to the divergent view of the state deferring to political fiat. The debate had the effect of polarizing opinion not only throughout the 1920s and 1930s leading up to WWII, but has also extended into the decades after Kelsen's death in 1973.

A third example of the controversies with which Kelsen was involved during his European years surrounded the severe disenchantment which many felt concerning the political and legal outcomes of WWI and the Treaty of Versailles. Kelsen believed that the blamelessness associated with Germany's political leaders and military leaders indicated a gross historical inadequacy of international law which could no longer be ignored. Kelsen devoted much of his writings from the 1930s and leading into the 1940s towards reversing this historical inadequacy which was deeply debated until ultimately Kelsen succeeded in contributing to the international precedent of establishing war crime trials for political leaders and military leaders at the end of WWII at Nuremberg and Tokyo.

=== Critical reception during his American years ===
This section covers Kelsen's years during his American years. Kelsen's participation and his part in the establishment of war crimes tribunals following WWII has been discussed in the previous section. The end of WWII and the start of the United Nations became a significant concern for Kelsen after 1940. For Kelsen, in principle, the United Nations represented in potential a significant phase change from the previous League of Nations and its numerous inadequacies which he had documented in his previous writings. Kelsen wrote his 700-page treatise on the United Nations, along with a subsequent two hundred page supplement, which became a standard text book on studying the United Nations for over a decade in the 1950s and 1960s.

Kelsen also became a significant contributor to the Cold War debate in publishing books on Bolshevism and communism, which he reasoned were less successful forms of government when compared to democracy. This, for Kelsen, was especially the case when dealing with the question of the compatibility of different forms of government in relation to the pure theory of law.

The second edition of Kelsen's magnum opus Reine Rechtslehre published in 1960 (English translation Pure Theory of Law, 1967) had at least as large an effect upon the international legal community as had the first edition published in 1934. Kelsen was a tireless defender of the application of legal science in defending his position and was constantly confronting detractors who were unconvinced that the domain of legal science was sufficient to its own subject matter. This debate has continued well into the twenty-first century.

Two anglophone critics of Kelsen were the legal realist Karl Llewellyn and the jurist Harold Laski. Llewellyn, as a firm anti-positivist against Kelsen, stated: "I see Kelsen's work as utterly sterile, save in by-products that derive from his taking his shrewd eyes, for a moment, off what he thinks of as 'pure law.'" In his democracy essay of 1955, Kelsen took up the defense of representative democracy made by Joseph Schumpeter in Schumpeter's book on democracy and capitalism. Although Schumpeter took a position unexpectedly favorable to socialism, Kelsen felt that a rehabilitation of the reading of Schumpeter's book more amicable to democracy could be defended and he quoted Schumpter's strong conviction that, to "realize the relative validity of one's convictions and yet stand for them unflinchingly," as consistent with his own defense of democracy. Kelsen himself made mixed statements concerning the extensiveness of the greater or lesser strict association of democracy and capitalism.

=== Critical reception of Kelsen's legacy after 1973 ===
Many of the controversies and critical debates during his lifetime continued after Kelsen's death in 1973. Kelsen's ability to polarize opinion among established legal scholars continued to influence the reception of his writings well after his death. The formation of the European Union recalled many of his debates with Schmitt on the issue of the degree of centralization which would in principle be possible, and what the implications concerning state sovereignty would be once the unification was put into place. Kelsen's contrast with Hart as representing two distinguishable forms of legal positivism has continued to be influential in distinguishing between Anglo-American forms of legal positivism from Continental forms of legal positivism. The implications of these contrasting forms continues to be part of the continuing debates within legal studies and the application of legal research at both the domestic and the international level of investigation.

== Hans Kelsen Institute and Hans Kelsen Research Center ==
For the occasion of Hans Kelsen's 90th birthday, the Austrian federal government decided on 14 September 1971 to establish a foundation bearing the name "Hans Kelsen-Institut". The Institut became operational in 1972. Its task is to document the Pure Theory of Law and its dissemination in Austria and abroad, and to inform about and encourage the continuation and development of the pure theory. To this end it produces, through the publishing house Manz, a book series (Schriftenreihe) that currently runs to more than 40 volumes. The Institut administers the rights to Kelsen's works and has edited several works from his unpublished papers, including General Theory of Norms (1979, translated 1991) and Secular Religion (2012, written in English). The Institut's database is free online with login registration. The founding directors of the Institut, Kurt Ringhofer and Robert Walter, held their posts until their deaths respectively in 1993 and 2010. The current directors are Clemens Jabloner (since 1993) and Thomas Olechowski (since 2011).

In 2006, the Hans-Kelsen-Forschungsstelle (Hans Kelsen Research Center) was founded under the direction of Matthias Jestaedt at the Friedrich-Alexander University of Erlangen-Nuremberg. After Jestaedt's appointment at the Albert-Ludwigs-University of Freiburg in 2011, the center was transferred there. The Hans-Kelsen-Forschungsstelle publishes, in cooperation with the Hans Kelsen-Institut and through the publishing house Mohr Siebeck, a historical-critical edition of Kelsen's works which is planned to reach more than 30 volumes; as of March 2025, the first eight volumes have been published, of which the first five are free online.

An extensive biography of Kelsen by Thomas Olechowski, Hans Kelsen: Biographie eines Rechtswissenschaftlers (Hans Kelsen: Biography of a Legal Scientist), was published in May 2020.

== Honours and awards ==
- 1938: Honorary Member of the American Society of International Law
- 1953: Karl Renner Prize
- 1960: Feltrinelli Prize
- 1961: Grand Merit Cross with Star of the Federal Republic of Germany
- 1961: Austrian Decoration for Science and Art
- 1966: Ring of Honour of the City of Vienna
- 1967: Great Silver Medal with Star for Services to the Republic of Austria
- 1981: Kelsenstrasse in Vienna Landstrasse (3rd District) named after him

== Publications ==
- Das Problem der Souveränität und die Theorie des Völkerrechts (1920).
- "The Conception of the State and Social Psychology, with a Special Reference to Freud’s Group Theory," International Journal of Psycho-Analysis 5(2024):1–38.
- Reine Rechtslehre, Vienna 1934. Introduction to the Problems of Legal Theory (1934; Litschewski Paulson and Paulson trans.), Oxford 1992; the translators have adopted the subtitle, Einleitung in die rechtswissenschaftliche Problematik, in order to avoid confusion with the English translation of the second edition.
- Law and Peace in International Relations (The Oliver Wendell Holmes Lectures 1940-1941). Cambridge (Mass.): Harvard University Press. 1942 – via Internet Archive. Union (N.J.) 1997.
- Society and Nature, 1943, The Lawbook Exchange, Ltd. 2009 ISBN 1584779861
- Peace Through Law, Chapel Hill 1944, Union (N.J.) 2000.
- The Political Theory of Bolshevism: A Critical Analysis, University of California Press 1948, The Lawbook Exchange, Ltd. 2011.
- The Law of the United Nations. First published under the auspices of The London Institute of World Affairs in 1950. With a supplement, Recent Trends in the Law of the United Nations [1951]. A critical, detailed, highly technical legal analysis of the United Nations charter and organization. Originally published conjointly: New York: Frederick A. Praeger, [1964].
- “Foundations of Democracy”, Ethics 66(1)1955: 1-101.
- Reine Rechtslehre, 2nd edn Vienna 1960 (much expanded from 1934 and effectively a different book); Studienausgabe with amendments, Vienna 2017 ISBN 978-3-16-152973-3
- Pure Theory of Law (1960; Knight trans.), Berkeley 1967, Union (N.J.) 2002.
- Théorie pure du droit (1960; Eisenmann French trans.), Paris 1962.
- General Theory of Law and State (German original unpublished; Wedberg trans.), 1945, New York 1961, Clark (N.J.) 2007.
- What is Justice? Berkeley 1957.
- "The Function of a Constitution" (1964; Stewart trans.) in Richard Tur and William Twining (eds), Essays on Kelsen, Oxford 1986; also in 5th and later editions of Lloyd's Introduction to Jurisprudence.
- Essays in Legal and Moral Philosophy (Weinberger sel., Heath trans.), Dordrecht 1973.
- Allgemeine Theorie der Normen (ed. Ringhofer and Walter), Vienna 1979; see English translation in 1990 below.
- Die Rolle des Neukantianismus in der Reinen Rechtslehre: Eine Debatte zwischen Sander und Kelsen (German Edition) by Hans Kelsen and Fritz Sander (Dec 31, 1988).
- General Theory of Norms (1979; Hartney trans.), Oxford 1990.
- Eckhart, Arnold, ed. (2004). A new science of politics : Hans Kelsen's reply to Eric Voegelin's "New Science of Politics" : a contribution to the critique of ideology. Frankfurt: Ontos Verlag. ISBN 9783110327717.
- The Essence and Value of Democracy Lanham, MD: Rowman & Littlefield, 2013. Translation of 1929 version of Vom Wesen und Wert der Demokratie.
- Secular Religion: A Polemic against the Misinterpretation of Modern Social Philosophy, Science, and Politics as "New Religions" (ed. Walter, Jabloner and Zeleny), Vienna and New York 2012 (written in English), revised edition 2017.

== Festschriften ==
- Engel, Salo; Métall, Rudolf A., eds. (1964). Law, State, and International Legal Order: Essays in Honor of Hans Kelsen. Knoxville: University of Tennessee Press.
- Merkl, Adolf J.; Marcic, René; Verdroß, Alfred; Walter, Robert, eds. (1971). Festschrift für Hans Kelsen zum 90. Geburtstag (in German). Vienna: Deuticke. ISBN 9783700543879.

== See also ==
- Legal positivism
- Neo-Kantianism
- Pure Theory of Law
- Basic norm
- Alfred Verdross
- Carl Schmitt
- H. L. A. Hart
- Joseph Raz

== Sources ==
- Baume, Sandrine (2011). Hans Kelsen and the Case for Democracy. Colchester: ECPR. ISBN 9781907301247.
- Kelsen, Hans (1934). Reine Rechtslehre: Einleitung in die rechtswissenschaftliche Problematik [Pure Theory of Law: Introduction to the problems of legal theory] (in German). Leipzig: F. Deuticke. OCLC 9072875.
- Kelsen, Hans (1967) [1960]. Pure Theory of Law. Translated by Knight, Max. Berkeley: University of California Press.
