= Translating "law" to other European languages =

Distinction in other languages not found in English

The translation of "law" to other European languages faces several difficulties. In most European languages, as well as some others influenced by European languages, there are two different words that can be translated to English as "law". For the general comparison in this article the Latin terms ius and lex will be used. Etymologically, ius has some relation to right, just or straight.

== General ==
There are in English two more or less synonymous adjectives, both from Latin origin, that correspond etymologically to the Continental distinction: the common word legal and the less common juridical (or even juristic). However, the words ius and lex are not synonyms.

Lex can sometimes be translated as legislation, statute, statutory law or even act, even if the corresponding legislatio, statutus and actus also exist. Lex is law made by a political authority, such as a parliament or a government. In modern societies, leges are usually written, though this is not a necessary feature. Lex is often used in the plural (leges), since each act is one lex.

On the other hand, ius is also polysemous, since it can mean either law or right. Continental legal scholars sometimes make a distinction between "subjective ius" (any legal right) and "objective ius" (the whole law), but this does not happen in ordinary language. The two senses of ius can be easily distinguished in most cases.

When ius means law, it usually has some semantic connection to what is right, just or straight. For instance, the German motto Einigkeit und Recht und Freiheit (literally Unity and law and freedom) has been translated as Unity and justice and freedom, even though there is a different word for justice (Gerechtigkeit). Lex does not have such a connection. Some translators of Kant's and Hegel's works have translated Recht as objective right (see Steiner, 2002, p. 276), although those works, especially Kant's, are just about law or, at most, about the best law.

Present day continental law schools and faculties claim to study ius. Medieval universities, on the contrary, usually had a faculty of leges. The English Wikipedia's article on "law" links to other languages' Wikipedia articles on the equivalent of ius.

== Examples ==
Language	law (in general)	statute, act of parliament	language	law (in general)	statute, act of parliament
Latin	ius	lex	Dutch	recht	wet
French	droit	loi	German	Recht	Gesetz
Spanish	derecho	ley	Italian	diritto	legge
Latvian	tiesības	likums	Russian	право	закон
Lithuanian	teisė	įstatymas	Maltese	ordni	liġi
Portuguese	direito	lei	Swedish	rätt	lag

There are a few European languages other than English where "law" translates into one word, such as Polish prawo. On the other side, a prominent non-European language which makes the distinction is Arabic, where قانون (qānūn) is equivalent to lex and ﺣـق (ḥaqq) is equivalent to ius.

To clarify the difference one may look at how these phrases translated into Spanish:

civil law = derecho civil	forbidden by law = prohibido por la ley
common law = derecho común	act of Congress = ley del Congreso
immigration law = derecho de inmigración	Immigration Act = ley de inmigración
natural law = derecho natural	laws of nature = leyes de la naturaleza
	bill = proyecto de ley

In bilingual and multilingual jurisdictions, a careful translation is needed in legal contexts to avoid ambiguity. Even excellent translation cannot capture all the connotations of the original words, however, and many scholars argue for bilingual judges who can parse both versions of the text.

In Canada since 1891 the "equal authenticity rule" has held that the French and English versions of all federal laws are considered equally authoritative. Nevertheless, the English and French texts of important may not translate exactly, which leaves open the possibility that justices may understand the same law to mean two different things. This includes the problem of "law" versus "droit".

For example, Osgoode Hall scholar Robert Leckey argues that in the 2006 Multani case over the banning of kirpans (Sikh ceremonial daggers) by a school board in Quebec, the justices of the Supreme Court of Canada, despite all writing their reasons in French, disagreed over the meaning of the phrase "ne peuvent être restreints que par une règle de droit" in Section 1 of the Charter of Rights and Freedoms, which appears in the English version of the text as "not prescribed by law". Relying on different cultural and academic backgrounds (Quebec's civil law and francophone administrative culture, versus the English common law and British traditions elsewhere in Canada) they either decided that the action of school board in banning the kirpan was, or was not, "une règle de droit" or "law" (without reference to the word "prescribed"). Lackey asserts that "[i]n administrative law from France, and in administrative law scholarship written in French in Quebec, a regulation is 'une règle de droit' and a decision is not 'une règle de droit'" whereas in English-language scholarship the difference between "prescribed by law" and not "prescribed by law" has nothing to do with a distinction between general norms and individual decisions.

This difference between English and other European languages is sometimes invoked in the debates between legal positivism, natural law and interpretivism. Berkowitz (2005) argues that the rise of legal positivism corresponds to a "transformation of the sense of 'law', a difficult topic made more so by a particular limitation of the English language", the non-distinction between ius and lex. Hart himself, in The concept of law (pp. 206 ff.), argued that the distinction between ius and lex might clarify the relation between law and morality. A similar point is made by Gardner (2004) in order to distinguish between "law" in general and "legal law".

== The discussion on the relation between ius (jus) and lex ==
Deviating from the above understanding of the distinction between ius and lex, continental legal positivists of the 19th century and the first half of the 20th century claimed that all ius would be lex.

In German "Law Schools", sometimes the following allegory is told: The word "Recht" would be closely related to the word "Rache" (which is "revenge" in English). It brings in the idea of "an eye for an eye" as the first instrument to overcome uncontrolled revenge. From this point of view, Recht would be institutionalized Rache. But this means: If someone says: "I had 'the right' to do this.", he should say: "I did it out of revenge.", as the person is not a "legal" institution.
