= David McCabe =

David McCabe may refer to:

- Dave McCabe (born 1981), lead vocalist and guitarist for English rock band, The Zutons
- David McCabe (baseball) (born 2000), a Canadian professional baseball third baseman in the Atlanta Braves organization
- David McCabe (philosopher), American philosopher
- David McCabe (photographer) (1940–2021), British photographer
- Dave McCabe (writer), writer of The Darkside Detective
