= Wil Waluchow =

Canadian philosopher (born 1953)

- Born: Wilfrid Joseph Waluchow; 8 December 1953 (age 72)
- Other name: W. J. Waluchow

Academic background
- Education: University of Western Ontario; University of Oxford
- Doctoral advisor: H. L. A. Hart

Academic work
- Discipline: Philosophy
- Sub-discipline: Philosophy of law
- School or tradition: Legal positivism
- Institutions: McMaster University
- Notable ideas: Inclusive legal positivism

Wilfrid Joseph Waluchow (born 1953), known as Wil Waluchow or W. J. Waluchow, is a Canadian philosopher, currently the Senator William McMaster Chair in Constitutional Studies at McMaster University, where he has taught since 1984. General jurisprudence and the philosophy of constitutional law are his main research interests.

After studying for his undergraduate and master's degrees at the University of Western Ontario, he went on to Oxford University to study philosophy of law under the supervision of H. L. A. Hart. Two notable contributions to the discipline are Inclusive Legal Positivism (1994), defending the inclusivist version of legal positivism and A Common Law Theory of Judicial Review: The Living Tree (2007).
