= Basic norm =

Concept in "Pure Theory of Law" by Hans Kelsen

'Basic norm' (German: Grundnorm) is a concept in the Pure Theory of Law created by Hans Kelsen, a jurist and legal philosopher. Kelsen used this word to denote the basic norm, order, or rule that forms an underlying basis for a legal system. The theory is based on a need to find a point of origin for all law, on which basic law and the constitution can gain their legitimacy (akin to the concept of first principles). This basic norm, however, is often described as hypothetical.

Reaction to the term has fallen into three broad areas including (i) Kelsen's original introduction of the term, (ii) the Neo-Kantian reception of the term by Kelsen's critics and followers, and (iii) the hypothetical and symbolic use of the term through the history of its application.

== Origins ==
Regarding Kelsen's original use of the term, its closest antecedent appears in writings of his colleague Adolf Merkl at the University of Vienna. Merkl was developing a structural research approach for the understanding of law as a matter of the hierarchical relationship of norms, largely on the basis of their being either superior or inferior to each other. Kelsen adapted and assimilated much of Merkl's approach into his own presentation of the Pure Theory of Law in both its original version and its revised version. For Kelsen, the importance of the basic norm was in large measure twofold since it importantly indicated the logical recursion of superior relationships between norms as they led to the norm that ultimately would have no other norm to which it was inferior. Its second feature was that it represented the importance that Kelsen associated with the concept of a fully centralized legal order in contrast to the existence of decentralized forms of government and legal orders.

== Responses and interpretations ==
=== Neo-Kantian ===
The second form of the reception of the term originated from the fairly extended attempt to read Kelsen as a Neo-Kantian following his early exchange with Hermann Cohen in 1913 concerning the publication of Kelsen's habilitation dissertation in 1911 on public law. Cohen was a leading Neo-Kantian and Kelsen was, in his own way, receptive to many of the ideas that Cohen had expressed in his published book review of Kelsen's writing. Kelsen had insisted that he had never used this material in the actual writing of his own book, though Cohen's ideas were attractive to him in their own right. This has resulted in one of the longest-running debates within the general Kelsen community as to whether Kelsen became a Neo-Kantian himself after the encounter with Cohen, or whether he managed to keep his own non-Neo-Kantian position intact, which he claimed was the prevailing circumstance when he first wrote his book in 1911.

The Neo-Kantians, when pressing the issue, would lead Kelsen into discussions concerning whether the existence of such a Grundnorm was strictly symbolic or whether it had a concrete foundation. This has led to the further division within this debate concerning the currency of the term Grundnorm as to whether it should be read, on the one hand, as part and parcel of Hans Vaihinger's "as-if" hypothetical construction. On the other hand, to those seeking a practical reading, the Grundnorm corresponded to something directly and concretely comparable to a sovereign nation's federal constitution, under which would be organized all or its regional and local laws, and no law would be recognized as being superior to it.

=== Symbolic ===
In different contexts, Kelsen would indicate his preferences in different ways, with some Neo-Kantians asserting that late in life Kelsen would largely abide by the symbolic reading of the term when used in the Neo-Kantian context, and as he has documented. The Neo-Kantian reading of Kelsen can further be subdivided into three subgroups, with each representing their own preferred reading of the meaning of the "Grundnorm", which were identifiable as (a) the Marburg Neo-Kantians, (b) the Baden-Baden Neo-Kantians, and (c) his own Kelsenian reading of the Neo-Kantian school with which his writings on this subject are often associated, as found in his response to the Cohen exchange circa 1911-1914.

=== Hart and others ===
This has led to criticism from noted authors such as H. L. A. Hart, who refers to the theory as a "needless duplication" of the "living reality" of the courts and officials actually identifying the law in accordance with the constitution's rules. It is mystifying to posit a rule beyond these rules, which adds, superfluously in Hart's view, that the constitution is to be obeyed. However, Hart's criticism weighs more on Kelsen's characterization of the Basic Norm as a "hypothesis", a "postulate", or an "assumption" rather than dismissing the concept entirely, still identifying it with his own 'Rule of Recognition'.

Kelsen also attempted to explain international law by the concept of a Grundnorm superior to all the Grundnorms of the state. This theory has been severely criticised by theorists like Hart and Lord Lloyd, though others, such as followers of various schools of the future development of the United Nations, including Grenville Clark and Louis B. Sohn of Harvard, who have strongly endorsed it.

== See also ==
- Norm (social)
- Pure Theory of Law § Basic norm
