= Gerhard Anschütz =

German jurist and educator

- Born: 10 January 1867; Halle (Saale), Prussia
- Died: 14 April 1948 (aged 81); Heidelberg, Germany

Academic work
- Discipline: Constitutional law
- Institutions: University of Tübingen; Heidelberg University; Humboldt University of Berlin

Gerhard Anschütz (10 January 1867 in Halle (Saale) – 14 April 1948 in Heidelberg) was a noted German teacher of constitutional law and the leading commentator of the Weimar Constitution. His principal work (with Richard Thoma) is the two-volume legal encyclopedia Handbuch des deutschen Staatsrechts; his constitutional commentary saw 14 editions during the Weimar Republic.

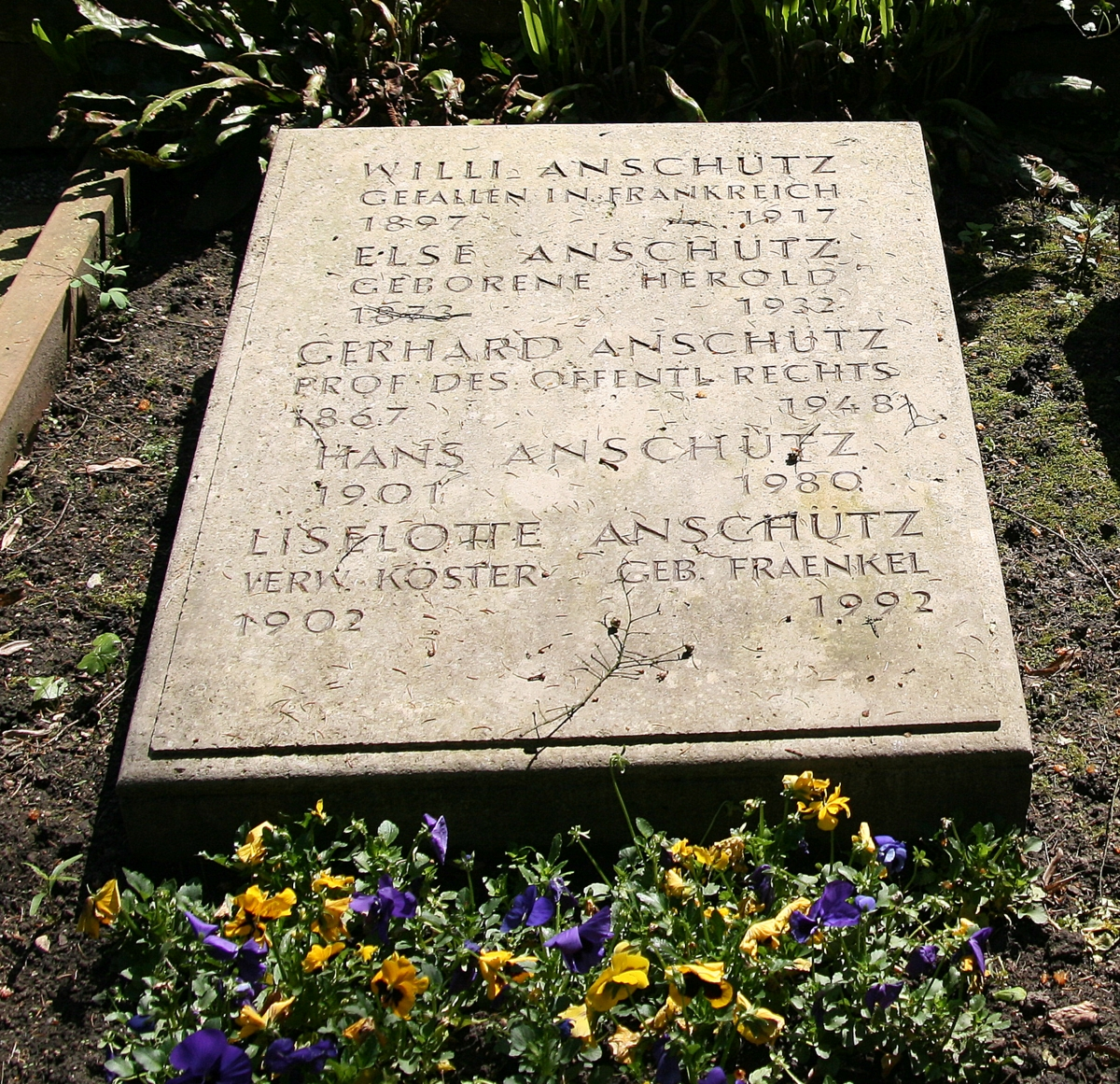
His grave in Heidelberg

Anschütz, a proponent of legal positivism, taught constitutional law in Tübingen (after 1899), Heidelberg (1900), Berlin (1908) and again Heidelberg (1916). A Democrat by conviction even during World War I, he resigned his teaching position in 1933 after the Nazis seized power. After World War II, he served as a consultant to the US military government and in this position was one of the fathers of the constitution of the Bundesland Hesse.

== Selected literature ==
- Georg Meyer, Lehrbuch des Deutschen Staatsrechts, bearbeitet von Gerhard Anschütz, 6. Auflage, Leipzig, 1905
- Gerhard Anschütz: Rezension von Hugo Preuß: Das deutsche Volk und die Politik, in: Preußische Jahrbücher, S. 164, 1916
- Gerhard Anschütz und Richard Thoma (Hrsg.): Handbuch des deutschen Staatsrechts, 2 Bände, Tübingen 1932.
- Gerhard Anschütz: Die Verfassung des Deutschen Reiches vom 11. August 1919. Ein Kommentar für Wissenschaft und Praxis, 14. Aufl., Berlin 1933
- Gerhard Anschütz, Aus meinen Leben. Erinnerungen von Gerhard Anschütz, herausgegeben und eingeleitet von Walter Pauly, Frankfurt/Main (1993)
