= Leslie Green (philosopher) =

Scottish-Canadian scholar

- Born: 1956 (age 69–70); Bridge of Weir, Renfrewshire, Scotland

Philosophical work
- Era: Contemporary philosophy
- Region: Western philosophy
- School: Analytic philosophy
- Institutions: Oxford University; Queen's University at Kingston; York University
- Main interests: Philosophy of law

Leslie Green (born 1956) is a Scottish-Canadian legal scholar specialising in jurisprudence. He is Professor of the Philosophy of Law and Fellow of Balliol College, Oxford University, and Professor of Law and Distinguished Faculty Fellow at Queen's University, Kingston. A legal positivist, his research also focuses on political philosophy and constitutional theory.

== Life and career ==
Born in Bridge of Weir, Renfrewshire, Scotland in 1956, and educated at Queen's University, Canada, and at Nuffield College, Oxford, he completed his dissertation—which culminated in a book, The Authority of the State—under professors Charles Taylor and later Joseph Raz. Like Raz, he has been an expositor and defender of the tradition of legal positivism and wrote the introduction and new supplementary materials for the third edition of H.L.A. Hart's classic work The Concept of Law.

In 2006, Green was elected to the Professorship of Philosophy of Law at Oxford University, which includes a Fellowship at Balliol College. The Professorship, a new statutory chair, was created upon the retirement of Joseph Raz from his personal Chair, also at Balliol. It is one of just two statutory professorships in jurisprudence at Oxford, the other being held by Ruth Chang. In 2010, the distinguished lawyer, Philip Gordon, endowed the Balliol fellowship, and Green became the first Pauline and Max Gordon Fellow at Balliol. At the same time, Green took up a part-time appointment as Professor and Distinguished University Fellow in the Philosophy of Law at Queen's University.

Prior to this, Green taught for most of his career at Osgoode Hall Law School of York University, in Toronto. He has also taught at Lincoln College, Oxford, at Boalt Hall Law School at the University of California, Berkeley; at the University of Chicago Law School, and was for several years a Regular Visiting Professor at the University of Texas at Austin law school. He has been a visiting fellow at Columbia University's Center for Law and Philosophy, and a Hauser Global Faculty member at New York University School of Law.

He is founding co-editor (with Brian Leiter) of Oxford Studies in Philosophy of Law. With the late John Gardner and Timothy Endicott, he is also co-editor of the book series, Oxford Legal Philosophy.

Green and 30 other academics signed a public letter in the Sunday Times published on June 16, 2019 entitled “Stonewall is stifling academia”. The letter claims that Stonewall are stifling academic progress by restricting academic freedom in the classroom. Green himself is on the record as a defender of the position that trans people should be addressed by the pronouns of their choice.

Green is a Freemason and a member of the Apollo University Lodge.

== Publications ==
=== Books ===
- Green, Leslie (1988). The Authority of the State. Oxford: Clarendon Press. ISBN 0-19-824926-8.

=== Selected articles ===
- "Should Law Improve Morality?’ 7 Criminal Law and Philosophy 473-494 (2013).
- "Two Worries about Respect for Persons," 120 Ethics 212 (2010).
- "Positivism and the Inseparability of Law and Morals," 83 New York University Law Review 1035 (2008).
- "Pornographies," 8 Journal of Political Philosophy 27 (2000).
- "Positivism and Conventionalism," 12 Canadian Journal of Law and Jurisprudence 35 (1999).
- "The Concept of Law Revisited," 94 Michigan Law Review 1687 (1997).
- “Stonewall is stifling academia”
- "The Forces of Law: Duty, Coercion and Power" 29 "Ratio Juris" 164-181 (2016).
