= Legal positivism =

School of thought of philosophy of law and jurisprudence

In legal philosophy, legal positivism is the theory that the existence of the law and its content depend on social facts, such as acts of legislation, judicial decisions, and customs, rather than on morality. This contrasts with theories such as natural law, which hold that law is necessarily connected to morality in such a way that any law that contradicts morality lacks legal validity.

Thomas Hobbes defined law as the command of the sovereign. This idea was elaborated in the 18th and 19th centuries by legal philosophers such as Jeremy Bentham and John Austin, who argued that a law is valid not because it is intrinsically moral or just, but because it comes from the sovereign, is generally obeyed by the people, and is backed up by sanctions. Hans Kelsen developed legal positivism further by separating law not only from morality, as the early positivists did, but also from empirical facts, introducing the concept of a norm as an "ought" statement as distinct from a factual "is" statement. In Kelsen's view, the validity of a legal norm derives from a higher norm, creating a hierarchy that ultimately rests on a "basic norm": this basic norm, not the sovereign, is the ultimate source of legal authority. In addition to Kelsen, other prominent legal positivists of the 20th century include H. L. A. Hart and Joseph Raz.

== Etymology and semantics ==
The term positivism in legal positivism is connected to the sense of the verb to posit rather than the sense of positive (as opposed to negative). In this sense, the term positivism is derived from Latin positus, the past participle of ponere, meaning "to place" or "to put". Legal positivism holds that laws are rules established (that is, "posited") by human beings, and that this act of positing the law makes it authoritative and binding.

== Concept ==
According to the positivist view, the source of a law is its enactment or recognition by a legal authority that is socially accepted and capable of enforcing its rules. The merits of a law are a separate issue from its legal validity: a law may be morally wrong or undesirable, but if it has been enacted by a legal authority with the power to do so, it is still a valid law.

Leslie Green summarises the distinction between merit and source: "The fact that a policy would be just, wise, efficient, or prudent is never sufficient reason for thinking that it is actually the law, and the fact that it is unjust, unwise, inefficient or imprudent is never sufficient reason for doubting it. According to positivism, law is a matter of what has been posited (ordered, decided, practiced, tolerated, etc.); as we might say in a more modern idiom, positivism is the view that law is a social construction."

Legal positivism does not claim that the laws so identified should be obeyed, or that there is necessarily value in having clear, identifiable rules (although some positivists may make these claims). Indeed, laws may be quite unjust, and the government may be illegitimate; if so, there may be no moral obligation to obey the law. Moreover, the fact that a law has been found to be valid by a court does not mean that the court should apply it in a particular case. As John Gardner has said, legal positivism is "normatively inert". It is a theory of law, not a theory of legal practice, adjudication, or political obligation, and legal positivists generally maintain that intellectual clarity is best achieved by separating these issues for independent analysis.

== Inclusive and exclusive legal positivism ==
Analytical jurisprudence often distinguishes between two types of legal positivism: inclusive and exclusive legal positivism. The former accepts, whereas the latter denies, that there may be cases in which determining what the law is follows from considerations about what the law ought to be according to morality.

Both qualify as legal positivism because they share two basic tenets. First, the "social thesis": law is essentially a human creation and therefore its content is ultimately determined by social facts, such as acts of legislation, judicial decisions, and customs. Second, the "separation thesis": law and morality are conceptually distinct phenomena and therefore a norm can belong to the law even if is unjust or unfair.

On the bedrock of these two shared assumptions, the two theories differ in their interpretation of how morality might influence law.

According to inclusive legal positivism (also called "soft positivism") it is possible that the criteria for identifying valid laws in a given legal system (that is, in Hart's terminology, its "rule of recognition") incorporate moral standards. In other words, while law and morality are conceptually distinct, a particular legal system might, as a matter of fact, make the validity of some laws dependent on their moral merit. Typically, this happens when a constitution includes a clause requiring laws to respect human rights, or human dignity, or equality, thus incorporating some moral standard into the legal system. Conformity with moral principle may be a condition of legal validity. However, this is not necessarily the case, but is contingent upon the content of the law and its rule of recognition, which may or may not include moral standards. Inclusive legal positivism has been embraced or defended by authors such as Jules Coleman, Matthew Kramer, Wil Waluchow, and H. L. A. Hart himself.

According to exclusive legal positivism ("hard positivism") the validity of a law is never determined by its moral content, but depends only on its source (e.g., being enacted by a legislature) and its compliance with the legal system's formal procedures. Therefore, if the constitution reference moral principles, these principles are not incorporated into the law as moral standards but rather the constitution is authorising the judges and the other law-applying institutions to develop and modify the law by resorting to moral reasoning. Conformity with moral principle is necessarily not a condition of legal validity. Exclusive legal positivism is mainly associated with the name of Joseph Raz and has been advocated by authors such as Brian Leiter, Andrei Marmor and Scott Shapiro.

To sum up, inclusive positivism allows for the possibility that morality can play a role in determining legal validity in some legal systems, while exclusive positivism holds that morality can never be a direct criterion for legal validity, even if a legal system references moral concepts.

== Methodological, theoretical and ideological legal positivism ==
In 1961 Norberto Bobbio argued that the phrase "legal positivism" is used with three different meanings, referring to different and largely independent doctrines, which he called "positivism as a way of approaching the study of law" (methodological legal positivism), "positivism as a theory or conception of law" (theoretical legal positivism) and "positivism as an ideology of justice" (Ideological legal positivism).

Methodological legal positivism is a value-free, scientific approach to the study of law and, at the same time, is a way of conceiving the object of legal knowledge. It is characterised by a sharp distinction between real law and ideal law (or "law as fact" and "law as value", "law as it is" and "law as it should be") and by the conviction that legal science should be concerned with the former.

Theoretical legal positivism is a cluster of theories about the nature of law related to a "statalist" conception of law. They include the theory that the law is a set of commands issued by the sovereign authority, whose binding force is guaranteed by the threat of sanctions (coercitive imperativism); a theory of legal sources, in which statute law enjoys supremacy (legalism); a theory of the legal order, which is supposed to be a complete and coherent system of norms, free of gaps (lacunae) and contradictions (antinomies); and a theory of legal interpretation, conceived of as a pure act of cognition: a mechanical and logical activity.

Finally, ideological legal positivism is defined by Bobbio as the normative theory according to which positive law ought to be obeyed (ethical legalism).

== Compared to legal realism ==
Sometimes the term 'positivist' is used in a pejorative sense to condemn a doctrine according to which the law is always clear (legal formalism) and, however unjust, must be strictly enforced by officials and obeyed by subjects (so-called 'ideological positivism'). When identified with legal formalism, legal positivism is opposed to legal realism. Legal positivism, understood as formalism, believes that in most cases the law provides definite guidance to its subjects and to judges; legal realists, on the other hand, often embrace rule scepticism, claiming that legal rules are indeterminate and do not constrain judicial discretion. However, both legal positivism and legal realism believe that law is a human construct. Moreover, most realists adopted some version of the positivist doctrine of the separation of law and morality.

According to Brian Leiter, the view that positivism and realism are incompatible positions is probably largely due to Hart's critique of legal realism, but American legal realists were "tacit legal positivists" who acknowledged that all law stems from authoritative sources such as statutes and precedents. Most legal realists denied the existence of natural law, had a scientific approach to the law based on the distinction between describing and evaluating the law, and denied the existence of an objective (moral or political) obligation to obey the law; they therefore qualified as legal positivists.

== Criticism ==
Legal positivism in Germany was famously rejected by Gustav Radbruch in 1946 where prosecution of Nazi supporters faced a challenge of assessing actions that had complied with Nazi law. In what has come to be known as the Radbruch formula, he argued that in general an unjust law must be recognised as law, "unless the conflict between statute and justice reaches such an intolerable degree that the statute, as 'flawed law', must yield to justice" or, more precisely: "Where there is not even an attempt at justice, where equality, the core of justice, is deliberately betrayed in the issuance of positive law, then the statute is not merely 'flawed law', it lacks completely the very nature of law."

== History ==
=== Antecedents ===
The main antecedent of legal positivism is empiricism, the thinkers of which range back as far as Thomas Hobbes, John Locke, George Berkeley, David Hume, and Auguste Comte. The main idea of empiricism is the claim that all knowledge of fact must be validated by sense experience or be inferred from propositions derived unambiguously from sense data. Further, empiricism is in opposition to metaphysics; for instance, Hume rejected metaphysics as mere speculation beyond what can be learnt from sense experience. The teachings of the empiricists preceded systemization of a positivist method for problems of comprehension and analysis, which was later represented by legal positivism.

=== Methodology ===
Traditionally, positivist theories of law have been developed by theorists applying the method of conceptual analysis to determine what is 'natural to say'. This approach assumes that legal concepts, being 'settled by the classificatory machinery of human thought', are 'amenable only to philosophical ... reflection'. Recently, researchers in the emerging field of experimental jurisprudence have challenged this assumption by exploring the relation between law and morality through systematic, psychological investigations of folk legal concepts.

Legal positivism is related to empiricist and logical positivist theoretical traditions. Its methods include descriptive investigations of particular legal orders. Peter Curzon wrote that this approach "utilizes in its investigations the inductive method" which proceeds "from observation of particular facts to generalizations concerning all such facts." These investigations eschew assessments of ethics, social welfare, and morality. As Julius Stone wrote, legal positivist investigation is concerned primarily with "an analysis of legal terms, and an inquiry into the logical interrelations of legal propositions". Further, law and its authority are framed as source-based: the validity of a legal norm depends not on its moral value, but on the sources determined by a social community's rules and conventions. This source-based conception aligns with the logical positivism of Rudolf Carnap, who rejected metaphysical conjecture about the nature of reality beyond observable events.

=== Thomas Hobbes and Leviathan ===
Thomas Hobbes, in his seminal work Leviathan, offered the first detailed theory of law as based on sovereign power. As Jean Elizabeth Hampton writes, "law is understood [by Hobbes] to depend on the sovereign's will. No matter what a law's content, no matter how unjust it seems, if it has been commanded by the sovereign, then and only then is it law." There is, however, debate surrounding Hobbes's status as a legal positivist.

=== Jeremy Bentham ===
The English jurist and philosopher Jeremy Bentham was arguably the greatest British legal positivist. In An Introduction to the Principles of Morals and Legislation, Bentham developed a theory of law as the expressed will of a sovereign. In A Fragment on Government, Bentham distinguished between the following types of people:

- Expositors – those who explained what the law in practice was;
- Censors – those who criticised the law in practice and compared it to their notions of what it ought to be.

The philosophy of law, considered strictly, was to explain the real laws of the expositors, rather than the criticisms of the censors.

Bentham is also noted for terming natural rights "nonsense upon stilts".

=== John Austin's command theory ===
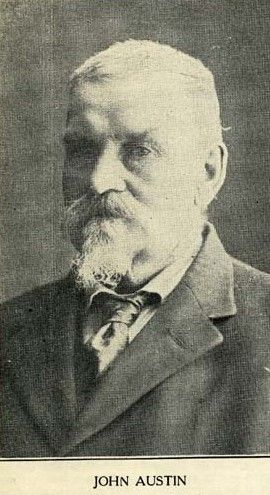
John Austin

John Austin partly emulated Bentham by writing The Province of Jurisprudence Determined. However, Austin differed from Bentham in a number of ways, as, for example, by endorsing the common law.

Differences aside, Austin embraced Hobbes's and Bentham's conception of law as a sovereign command, whose authority is recognised by most members of a society; the authority of which is enforced by the use of sanctions, but which is not bound by any human superior. The criterion for validity of a legal rule in such a society is that it has the warrant of the sovereign and will be enforced by the sovereign power and its agents.

The three main tenets of Austin's command theory are:

- laws are commands issued by the uncommanded commander, i.e. the sovereign;
- such commands are enforced by sanctions;
- a sovereign is one who is obeyed by the majority.

Austin considered law to be commands from a sovereign that are enforced by a threat of sanction. In determining 'a sovereign', Austin recognised it is one whom society obeys habitually. This sovereign can be a single person or a collective sovereign such as Parliament, with a number of individuals, with each having various authoritative powers. Austin's theory is also somewhat brief in his explanations of Constitutions, International Law, non-sanctioned rules, or law that gives rights. Insofar as non-sanctioned rules and laws that allow persons to do things, such as contract law, Austin said that failure to obey the rules does result in sanctions; however, such sanctions are in the form of "the sanction of nullity".

=== Hans Kelsen ===
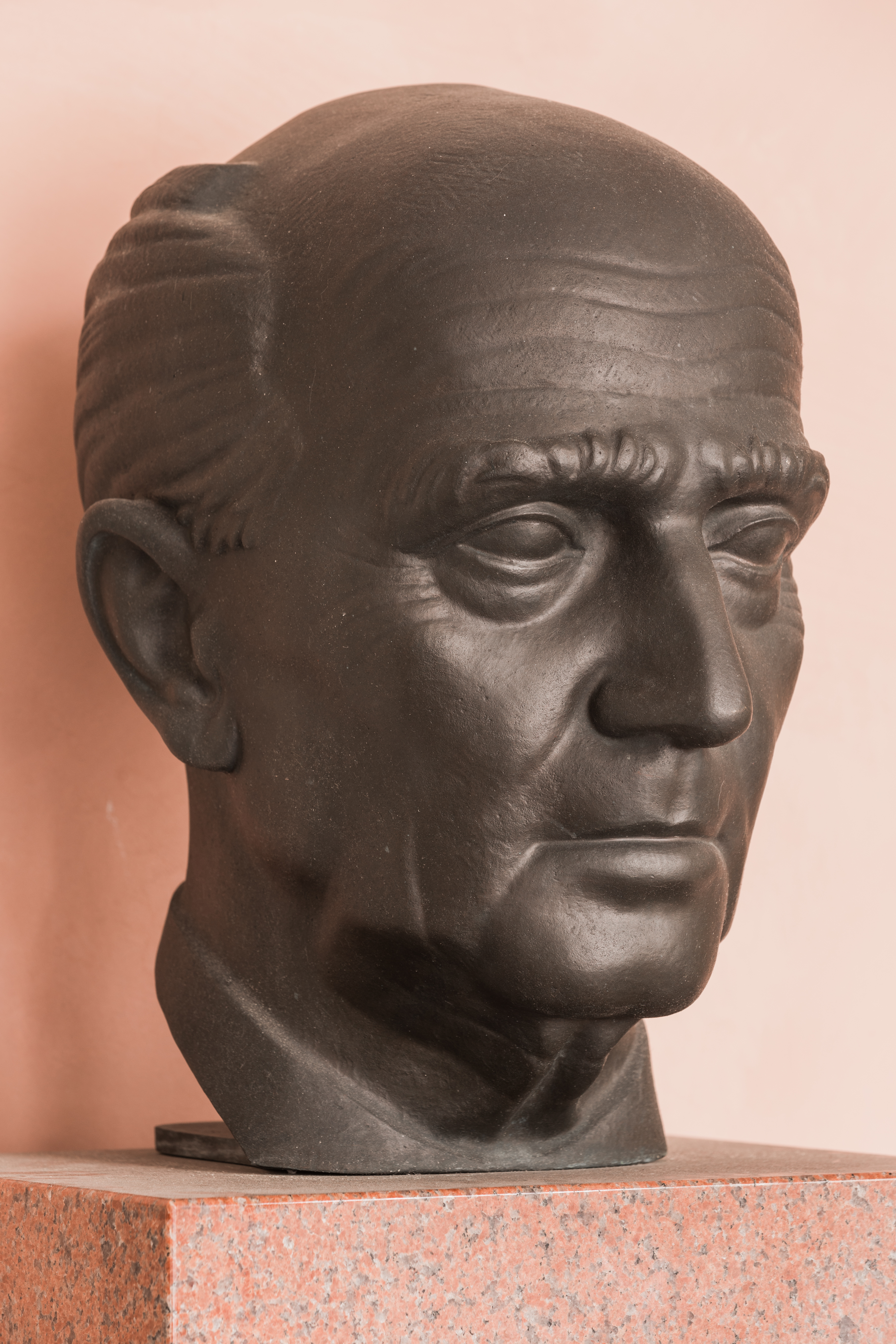
Bust of Hans Kelsen in the Arkadenhof, University of Vienna

The British legal positivism hitherto mentioned was founded on empiricism; by contrast, legal positivism was founded on the transcendental idealism of the German philosopher Immanuel Kant. Whereas British legal positivists regard law as distinct from morals, their Germanic counterparts regard law as separate from both fact and morals. A proponent of Germanic legal positivism is Hans Kelsen, whose thesis of legal positivism is explained by Suri Ratnapala, who writes:

The key elements of Kelsen's theory are these.... A norm, unlike a fact, is not about what there is but is about what ought to be done or not done. Whereas facts exist in the physical world, norms exist in the world of ideas.... The requirement that a person who commits theft ought to be punished is a norm. It does not cease being a norm because the thief is not punished. (He may not get caught.) ... Not all norms are laws. There are also moral norms. Legal norms are coercive; moral norms are not.

From this framework, Kelsen opined that the regression of validated norms cannot go on infinitely and must arrive at a first cause, which he called a 'basic norm' (German: Grundnorm). The legal system is therefore a system of legal norms connected to one another by their common origin, like the branches and leaves of a tree.

For Kelsen, "sovereignty" was an arbitrary concept: "We can derive, however, from this concept of sovereignty only what we have purposely put into its definition". Kelsen attracted disciples among scholars of public law worldwide. These disciples developed schools of thought to extend his theories, such as the Vienna School in Austria and the Brno School in Czechoslovakia. In English-speaking countries, H. L. A. Hart and Joseph Raz are perhaps the best-known authors who were influenced by Kelsen, though their legal philosophies differed from Kelsen's theories in several respects.

=== H. L. A. Hart ===
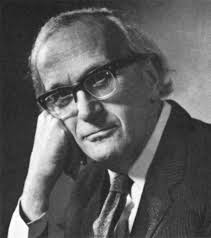
H. L. A. Hart

Hart approved of Austin's theory of a sovereign but claimed that Austin's command theory failed in several important respects. Among the ideas Hart developed in The Concept of Law (1961) are:

- a critique of Austin's theory that a law is a command of the sovereign enforced by a threat of punishment;
- a distinction between internal and external consideration of law and rules, influenced by Max Weber's distinction between legal and sociological perspectives on law;
- a distinction between primary and secondary legal rules, such that a primary rule, such as a criminal law, governs conduct, and secondary rules provide methods by which primary rules are recognized, changed or judicially applied. Hart identifies three types of secondary rule:
  - a rule of recognition, a rule by which any member of society may check to discover what the primary rules of the society are;
  - a rule of change, by which existing primary rules might be created, altered or abolished;
  - a rule of adjudication, by which the society might determine when a rule has been violated and prescribe a remedy;
- a late reply (1994 edition) to Ronald Dworkin, who, in Taking Rights Seriously (1977), A Matter of Principle (1985) and Law's Empire (1986), criticized legal positivism in general and Hart's account of law in particular.

==== Five contentions ====
In 1958, Hart analyzed descriptions or definitions as given by different proponents of legal positivism as including one or more of these five contentions in different combinations:

- laws are commands of human beings;
- there is not any necessary relation between law and morality, that is, between law as it is and as it ought to be;
- analysis (or study of the meaning) of legal concepts is worthwhile and is to be distinguished from history or sociology of law, as well as from criticism or appraisal of law, for example with regard to its moral value or to its social aims or functions;
- a legal system is a closed, logical system in which correct decisions can be deduced from predetermined legal rules without reference to social considerations (legal formalism);
- moral judgments, unlike statements of fact, cannot be established or defended by rational argument, evidence, or proof ("noncognitivism" in ethics).

Historically, legal positivism is in opposition to natural law's theories of jurisprudence, with particular disagreement surrounding the natural law claim that there is a necessary connection between law and morality.

=== Joseph Raz ===
A pupil of Hart's, Joseph Raz was important in continuing Hart's arguments of legal positivism after Hart's death. This included editing in 1994 a second edition of Hart's The Concept of Law, with an additional section including Hart's responses to other philosophers' criticisms of his work.

Raz also argued, contrary to Hart, that the validity of a law can never depend on its morality.

== See also ==
- Constitution in exile
- Critical legal studies
- Leslie Green
- International legal theory
- Interpretivism (legal)
- Georg Jellinek
- A. V. Dicey
- Judicial activism
- Legal formalism
- Legal naturalism
- Legal process school
- Legal realism
- Legalism (Chinese philosophy)
- Libertarian theories of law
- Living Constitution
- Natural law
- New legal realism
- Philosophy of law
- Positive law
- Rule according to higher law
- Social constructionism
- Strict constructionism
- Translating "law" to other European languages
- Jurisprudence of concepts
- Jurisprudence of interests
- Jurisprudence of values
