= Joseph Raz =

Israeli philosopher (1939–2022)

Joseph Raz FBA
- יוסף רז
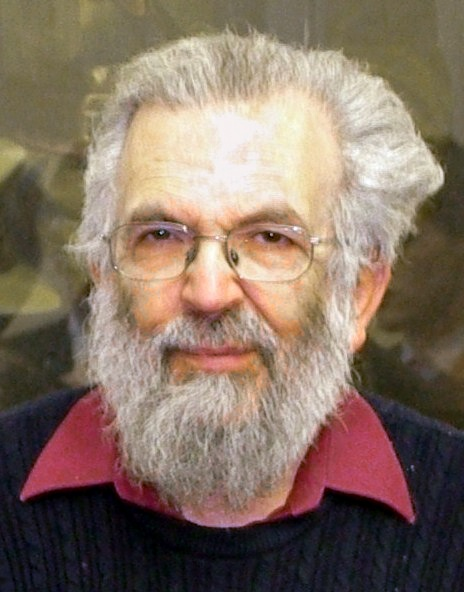
- Raz in 2009
- Born: Joseph Zaltsman; 21 March 1939; Haifa, Mandatory Palestine
- Died: 2 May 2022 (aged 83); Hammersmith, London, England
- Awards: Tang Prize (2018)

Education
- Education: Hebrew University of Jerusalem (MJur); Balliol College, Oxford (DPhil)
- Thesis: The Concept of Legal System (1967)
- Doctoral advisor: H. L. A. Hart

Philosophical work
- Era: Contemporary philosophy
- Region: Western philosophy
- School: Legal positivism Perfectionist liberalism
- Institutions: Hebrew University; University of Oxford; Columbia University; King's College London
- Main interests: Legal and political philosophy
- Notable ideas: Perfectionist liberalism

Joseph Raz FBA (/rɑːz/; Hebrew: יוסף רז; born Joseph Zaltsman; 21 March 1939 – 2 May 2022) was an Israeli legal, moral and political philosopher. He was an advocate of legal positivism and is known for his conception of perfectionist liberalism. Raz spent most of his career as a professor of philosophy of law at Balliol College, Oxford, and was latterly a part-time professor of law at Columbia University Law School and a part-time professor at King's College London. He received the Tang Prize in Rule of Law in 2018.

== Life and career ==
Joseph Zaltsman was born on 21 March 1939 in Haifa (then in Mandatory Palestine) to Sonya and Shmuel Zaltsman. He graduated in 1963 from the Hebrew University of Jerusalem with a Magister Juris, summa cum laude. Also in 1963, he changed his surname to Raz. Later, with funds provided by the Hebrew University, Raz pursued a doctorate at the University of Oxford under the supervision of H. L. A. Hart. Raz had met Hart earlier at a conference in Israel, impressing him by pointing out a flaw in his reasoning that had previously eluded him; Hart encouraged him to go to Oxford for further study. Raz studied at Balliol College and completed his Doctor of Philosophy in 1967.

After completing his PhD, Raz returned to Israel to teach at the Hebrew University as a lecturer in the faculty of law and department of philosophy. In 1971, he was given tenure and promoted to senior lecturer. In 1972, he returned to Balliol as a fellow and tutor in law, becoming a professor of philosophy of law, Oxford University, from 1985 to 2006, and then a research professor from 2006 to 2009. In 2002, he also became a professor at Columbia Law School in New York and starting in 2011 was a research professor of law at King's College London.

Raz died in his sleep at Charing Cross Hospital in Hammersmith, London, on 2 May 2022, aged 83. The Oxford Law Faculty called him "one of the last remaining giants of jurisprudence and philosophy".

== Philosophical work ==
=== Political philosophy ===
Raz's first book, The Concept of a Legal System, was based on his doctoral thesis. A later book, The Morality of Freedom, won two prizes: the 1987 W. J. M. Mackenzie Book Prize from the Political Studies Association of the United Kingdom, awarded to the best book in political science each calendar year; and the 1988 Elaine and David Spitz Book Prize from the Conference for the Study of Political Thought, New York, awarded annually for the best book in liberal and/or democratic theory that had been published two years earlier. The book develops a conception of perfectionist liberalism.

In defending his conception of perfectionist liberalism, Raz argues that political institutions are justified by virtue of their contribution to persons' well-being. He argues that a person's well-being depends on ability to pursue personal goals. However, in Raz's view, well-being does not occur upon achievement of any self-set goal. Rather, in David McCabe's words, "successful pursuit of objectively valuable goals" produces well-being according to Raz.

Raz's argument for perfectionist liberalism follows from this view of well-being combined with two other premises. First, that human goals—and, therefore, human well-being—are conceived through, and depend on, what McCabe calls "social forms". Social forms are ways of being and acting that are developed socially and make sense only in the context of a given society. For example, one can only understand the social roles of a physician, friend, or parent by considering the rights and obligations that attach to that role in a social context.

The second premise of the argument is that people need autonomy to occupy many social forms in liberal societies and achieve the goals that these social forms set out. Thus, a person must be autonomous to achieve the goals set by the social forms in a liberal society. Combined with Raz's view that political institutions are justified by virtue of their contribution to well-being and his argument that well-being, for humans, depends on social forms, his claim about autonomy shows that autonomy is necessary for well-being wherever social forms require autonomy. If liberal societies' social forms require autonomy, then liberal societies should support autonomy.

=== Philosophy of law ===
A pupil of H. L. A. Hart, Raz was important in continuing the development of legal positivism both before and after Hart's death. Raz was also co-editor of a second edition of Hart's The Concept of Law with a postscript including Hart's responses to other philosophers' criticisms of his work.

Raz argued for a distinctive understanding of legal commands as exclusionary reasons for action and for the "service conception" of authority, according to which those subject to an authority "can benefit by its decisions only if they can establish their existence and content in ways which do not depend on raising the very same issues which the authority is there to settle". This, in turn, supports Raz's argument for legal positivism—in particular "the sources thesis", "the idea that an adequate test for the existence and content of law must be based only on social facts, and not on moral arguments".

== Influence ==
Raz was acknowledged by his contemporaries as being one of the most important legal philosophers of his generation. He authored and edited twelve books, namely The Concept of a Legal System (1970), Practical Reason and Norms (1975), The Authority of Law (1979), The Morality of Freedom (1986), Authority (1990), Ethics in the Public Domain (1994), Engaging Reason (1999), Value, Respect and Attachment (2001), The Practice of Value (2003), Between Authority and Interpretation (2009), From Normativity to Responsibility (2011) and The Roots of Normativity (2022). His most recent work deals less with legal theory and more with political philosophy and practical reasoning. In moral theory, Raz defended value pluralism and the idea that various values are incommensurable.

Raz's work has been cited by the Supreme Court of Canada in such cases as British Columbia v Imperial Tobacco Canada Ltd and Sauvé v Canada (Chief Electoral Officer).

Several of Raz's students became legal and moral philosophers, including two current professors in jurisprudence at Oxford, Leslie Green and Timothy Endicott, and the former professor of jurisprudence John Gardner.

== Honors and awards ==
Raz was elected a fellow of the British Academy in 1987 and of the American Academy of Arts & Sciences in 1992. He was awarded honorary doctorates by the Catholic University of Brussels, 1993, by King's College London, 2009, and by Hebrew University, 2014. In 2005 he received the International Prize for Legal Research 'Hector Fix-Zamudio' from the National Autonomous University of Mexico, and in 2009 a Vice-Presidency Award from the Law Society of University College Dublin. In 2018 he received the Tang Prize in Rule of Law from Taiwan.

In 2000–2001, he gave the Tanner Lectures on Human Values on "The Practice of Value" at the University of California, Berkeley.

== Books ==
- The Concept of a Legal System: An Introduction to the Theory of Legal System (2 ed.). Oxford University Press. 1980 [1970]. ISBN 0198251890.
- Practical Reason and Norms (2 ed.). Princeton University Press. 1990 [1975]. ISBN 0691078513.
- The Authority of Law: Essays on Law and Morality (2 ed.). Oxford University Press. 2009 [1979]. ISBN 9780199573561.
- The Morality of Freedom. Oxford: Clarendon Press. 1986. ISBN 0198247729.
- Ethics in the Public Domain: Essays in the Morality of Law and Politics (Rev. ed.). Clarendon Press. 1996 [1994]. ISBN 0198260695.
- Engaging Reason: On the Theory of Value and Action. Oxford University Press. 1999. ISBN 9780199248001.
- Value, Respect and Attachment. Cambridge University Press. 2001. ISBN 052180180X.
- The Practice of Value. Oxford University Press. 2003. ISBN 0199261474.
- Between Authority and Interpretation: On the Theory of Law and Practical Reason. Oxford University Press. 2009. ISBN 9780199562688.
- From Normativity to Responsibility. Oxford University Press. 2011. ISBN 9780199693818.
- The Roots of Normativity. Oxford University Press. 2022. ISBN 9780192847003.

== See also ==
- Philosophy of law
