= Tony Honoré =

British lawyer and jurist (1921–2019)

Tony Honoré QC FBA
- Born: Anthony Maurice Honoré; March 30, 1921; London
- Died: February 26, 2019 (aged 97)
- Title: Regius Professor of Civil Law

Academic background
- Education: New College, Oxford (BA, BCL
- Influences: H. L. A. Hart

Academic work
- Discipline: Private law and Roman law
- Institutions: All Souls College, Oxford
- Notable works: Causation in the Law (with H. L. A. Hart)
- Military career
- Service years: 1940–1942
- Conflicts: World War II; Battle of El Alamein

Anthony Maurice Honoré (30 March 1921 – 26 February 2019) was a British lawyer and jurist known for his work on ownership, causation and Roman law.

== Biography ==
Honoré was born in London but was brought up in South Africa. He served in the South African Infantry during the Second World War and was severely wounded in the Battle of Alamein. After the war he continued his studies at New College, Oxford, and he lived and taught in Oxford for seventy years, including periods as a fellow of The Queen's College and then of New College. Between 1971 and 1988 he was Regius Professor of Civil Law at Oxford and a Fellow of All Souls College, Oxford; for nearly 30 years after retiring from his chair, he taught seminars in Jurisprudence for the BCL jointly with John Gardner.

Honoré was a close associate of H. L. A. Hart. They jointly wrote Causation in the Law (Oxford, 1st ed. 1959, 2nd 1985) in 1953-8 and Honoré had some influence on Hart's The Concept of Law (Oxford, 1st ed. 1961, 2nd 1994). A number of his philosophical papers are collected in Making Law Bind (Oxford, 1987) and Responsibility and Fault (Oxford, 1999) and his contributions to legal philosophy and Roman law, which range widely, include 16 books and more than a hundred articles published over six decades.

Honoré was an honorary Queen's Counsel and Bencher of Lincoln's Inn, a member of the British and Bavarian Academies and of the International Academy of Comparative Law. In South Africa, his standing has been recognised by the award of honorary degrees from the Universities of South Africa, Stellenbosch and Cape Town. When receiving this last degree, in 1990, he had the opportunity to give an address. He used this opportunity to point to the parallel between the extension of citizenship to all free people in the Roman Empire, regardless of race, sex or religion, by Caracalla in 211 AD, and the extension of citizenship to the whole of the South African population. This he foresaw would need an adjustment of the legal system, and he suggested a constitutional court to carry it through with a parallel to the composition of the German Constitutional Court. Nelson Mandela approved of this. It was put into practice in 1995, and has been a success.

He delivered the Hamlyn Lectures (1982), the Blackstone and H. L. A. Hart lectures, the J. H. Gray lectures at Cambridge and the Maccabaean lecture in Jurisprudence at the British Academy. Three Festschriften have been published in his honour.

- Neil MacCormick and Peter Birks (eds., 1985) The Legal Mind: Essays for Tony Honoré;
- Peter Cane and John Gardner (eds., 2001) Relating to Responsibility: Essays in Honor of Tony Honoré on his 80th Birthday.
- Daniel Visser and Max Loubser (eds., 2011) Thinking about Law: Essays for Tony Honore;

On 17 September 2004 he received honorary citizenship from the then mayor of San Ginesio, Pietro Enrico Parrucci.

== List of publications ==
Books

- Gaius: a biography (Oxford, 1962)
- Tribonian (London, 1978)
- Sex Law in England (London: Duckworth, 1978)
- Emperor and Lawyers: with a paligenesia of third-century imperial rescripts 193–305 AD (London, 1st ed. 1981; Oxford, 2nd ed. 1994)
- Ulpian: pioneer of human rights (Oxford, 1st ed. 1982; 2nd ed. 2002)
- The Quest for Security: Employees, Tenants, Wives (London: Stevens, 1982)
- Causation in the Law (Oxford, 1st ed. 1959; 2nd 1985) – with H. L. A. Hart
- Making Law Bind (Oxford, 1987)
- Concordance to the Digest Jurists (Oxford: OMP, 1980) – with J. Menner
- About Law: an introduction (Oxford, 1995)
- Law in the Crisis of the Empire 379–455 AD: the Theodosian dynasty and its quaestors (Oxford, 1998)
- Responsibility and Fault (Oxford, 1999)
- Justinian's Digest: character and compilation (Oxford, 2010)

Articles

- "Responsibility and luck: the moral basis of strict liability" (1988) 104 Law Quarterly Review 530
