= Franz Deuticke =

- Founded: 1878
- Founder: Franz Deuticke & Stanislaus Töplitz
- Defunct: 2019
- Country of origin: Austria
- Headquarters location: Leipzig, Vienna
- Nonfiction topics: natural sciences, medicine, psychology
- Official website: -

Franz Deuticke was a Viennese scientific publishing company, started by Stanislaus Töplitz and Franz Deuticke (1850–1919) in 1878 as Töplitz & Deuticke, changing its name in 1886 when Deuticke had become sole proprietor. Since the 1880s, it published many of Sigmund Freud's works. Deuticke was amalgamated with Paul Zsolnay Verlag in 2019.
