= David McCabe (philosopher) =

American philosopher

Education
- Education: Williams College (BA), Northwestern University (PhD)

Philosophical work
- Era: 21st-century philosophy
- Region: Western philosophy
- Institutions: Colgate University
- Main interests: ethics, political philosophy
- Notable ideas: modus vivendi liberalism

David McCabe is an American philosopher and Richard J. and Joan Head Chair in Philosophy at the Colgate University. He is known for his works on modus vivendi liberalism.

== Books ==
- Modus Vivendi Liberalism: Theory and Practice, Cambridge University Press (2010)
