= John Gardner (legal philosopher) =

Scottish legal philosopher (1965–2019)

John Gardner FBA
- Gardner in 2018
- Born: 25 March 1965; Glasgow, Scotland
- Died: 11 July 2019 (aged 54)

Education
- Education: New College, Oxford (BA, BCL, MA, DPhil)

Philosophical work
- Era: Contemporary philosophy
- Region: Western philosophy
- School: Analytic; Legal positivism
- Institutions: University of Oxford
- Main interests: Legal philosophy Criminal law Tort law

John Gardner FBA (23 March 1965 – 11 July 2019) was a Scottish legal philosopher. He was senior research fellow at All Souls College, Oxford, and prior to that the Professor of Jurisprudence at the University of Oxford and a fellow of University College, Oxford.

== Life and career ==
John Blair Gardner was born in Glasgow on 23 March 1965, the elder of two sons, to William Russell Williamson Gardner and Sylvia Gardner (née Hayward-Jones). His parents were both Germanists. His mother was a secondary school teacher and his father was a senior lecturer at the University of Glasgow and Chairman of the city's Goethe-Institut.

John Gardner attended Glasgow Academy from 1970 to 1982. He won (in 1982) a place to study modern languages at New College but switched to law before his first term (in 1983) began.

At the University of Oxford, Gardner received his BA, BCL (winning the Vinerian Scholarship), MA, and DPhil, under the supervision of Joseph Raz and Tony Honoré. He was associated with New College (as a student, 1983–7), All Souls College (as a fellow, 1986–1991, 1998–2000 and 2016–2019), and Brasenose College (as a fellow, 1991–1996). From 1996 to 2000 he was reader in legal philosophy at King's College London.

In 2000, at the age of just 35, he was appointed Professor of Jurisprudence at Oxford, taking over the chair previously held by H. L. A. Hart and Ronald Dworkin. In order to dedicate more time to his research he resigned the chair in 2016 and returned to All Souls as a senior research fellow.

Gardner died of cancer in July 2019, aged 54.

== Honours and awards ==
Gardner held several visiting positions, including at Columbia (2000), Yale (2002–3, 2005), Princeton (2008), the Australian National University (2003, 2006, 2008), and most recently Cornell (2015). A (non-practising) barrister since 1988, Gardner was elected an (Academic or Honorary) Bencher of the Honourable Society of the Inner Temple (one of the Inns of Court) in 2003. He was elected a fellow of the British Academy in 2013.

== Works ==
=== Books ===
- Offences and Defences: Selected Essays in the Philosophy of Criminal Law (2007)
- Law as a Leap of Faith: Essays on Law in General (2012)
- From Personal Life to Private Law (2018)
- Torts and other Wrongs (2020)

=== Open access papers ===
see Gardner's SSRN author page for papers free for PDF download (or browser viewing with registration) titles include Law as a Leap of Faith (2000)

- papers in the Oxford Journal of Legal Studies, including On the Ground of Her Sex(uality) (1988) which was cited in the landmark Navtej Singh Johar v. Union of India ruling
- Legal Positivism: 5 1/2 Myths, (2001) American Journal of Jurisprudence: Vol. 46 : Iss. 1, Article 12 [PDF view/download]
- 'Simply In Virtue of Being Human' The Whos and Whys of Human Rights (2007) Journal of Ethics and Social Philosophy, Vol 2 No 2 (2007): Volume II, Issue 2 [PDF download]

Also see homepage 'publications' and Gardner's Academia.edu page for preprints/drafts

Full list of publications at Gardner's Faculty Homepage

=== Interviews ===
- (2019) interview by Carolina Flores. [text]
- (2018) John Gardner and Timothy Macklem discuss Joseph Raz [video]
- (2017) Law as a Leap of Faith: John Gardner interviewed by Richard Marshall [text]
- (2012) Interview with John Gardner, by Diego Papayannis [video]
- (2013) Gardner, John (17 March 2013). John Gardner on Constitutions (with transcript) (mp3). Philosophy Bites (podcast). Episode #213. Interviewed by Warburton, Nigel.
- (2010) Radio New Zealand National “Nine to Noon” interview on the morality of policing. [audio]

=== Lectures (video/podcast) ===
- The Aristotelian Society presents: Professor John Gardner (Oxford) – Discrimination: The Good, the Bad, and the Wrongful (podcast, 2017)
- John Gardner on "What is Legal Pluralism?" (Osgoode Hall Law School, 8 May 2013) (Video) [also hosted here on Youtube]
