= H. L. A. Hart =

British legal philosopher (1907–1992)

H. L. A. Hart FBA
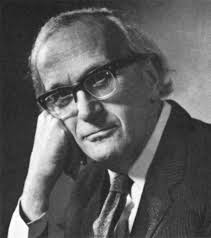
- Born: Herbert Lionel Adolphus Hart; 18 July 1907; Harrogate, England
- Died: 19 December 1992 (aged 85); Oxford, England
- Spouse: Jenifer Williams (m. 1941)

Education
- Education: New College, Oxford (BA)

Philosophical work
- Era: Contemporary philosophy
- Region: Western philosophy
- School: Analytic philosophy; analytical jurisprudence; legal positivism; liberalism; ordinary-language philosophy
- Institutions: New College, Oxford; University College, Oxford; Brasenose College, Oxford
- Doctoral students: Brian Barry; John Finnis; Peter Hacker; David Hodgson; Joseph Raz; Wil Waluchow
- Notable students: Laurence Houlgate; Herbert Morris
- Main interests: Legal philosophy; jurisprudence; political philosophy
- Notable works: The Concept of Law (1961)
- Notable ideas: Empiricist normative foundations of legal systems; rule of recognition

Herbert Lionel Adolphus Hart (/hɑːrt/; 18 July 1907 – 19 December 1992) was a British legal philosopher. One of the most influential legal theorists of the 20th century, he was instrumental in the development of the theory of legal positivism, which was popularised by his book The Concept of Law. Hart's contributions focused on the nature of law, the relationship between law and morality, and the analysis of legal rules and systems, introducing concepts such as the "rule of recognition" that have shaped modern legal thought.

Born in Harrogate, Hart received a first-class honours degree in classical studies from New College, Oxford, before qualifying at the English bar. During World War II, Hart served in British intelligence, working with figures including Alan Turing and Dick White. After the war, Hart transitioned to academia, becoming Professor of Jurisprudence at the University of Oxford in 1952, a position he held until 1969.

In addition to his legal positivism, Hart engaged in important debates on the role of law in society, most famously with Patrick Devlin, over the enforcement of morality through law, and with his successor at Oxford, Ronald Dworkin, on the nature of legal interpretation. Hart's influence extended beyond his own work, mentoring legal thinkers including Joseph Raz, John Finnis, and Ronald Dworkin.

== Early life and education ==
Herbert Lionel Adolphus Hart was born on 18 July 1907, the son of Rose Samson Hart and Simeon Hart, in Harrogate to which his parents had moved from the East End of London. His father was a Jewish tailor of German and Polish origin; his mother, of Polish origin and a daughter of successful retailers in the clothing trade, handled customer relations and the finances of their firm. He had three siblings, two elder brothers, Albert (1901) and Reggie (1902), and a younger sister, Sybil (1915).

Hart was educated at Cheltenham College, Bradford Grammar School, and at New College, Oxford. He took a first in classical greats in 1929. Hart became a barrister and practised successfully at the Chancery bar from 1932 to 1940. He was good friends with Richard Wilberforce, Douglas Jay, and Christopher Cox, among others. He received a Harmsworth Scholarship to the Middle Temple and also wrote literary journalism for the periodical John O'London's Weekly.

== Second World War and marriage ==
Hart married Jenifer Fischer Williams in 1941. She had joined the Home Office as a civil servant in 1936, later becoming an Oxford historian at St Anne's College, specialising in the history of the police. During the mid-1930s, Williams had been, for some years, a covert member of the Communist Party of Great Britain, but she never engaged in espionage for the Soviet Union, and had left the party by the start of the war.

Three decades later, she, having been in a position to have passed information to the Soviets, was interviewed by Peter Wright, MI5's official spy hunter. She explained her situation, and Wright took no action. Her work as civil servant was in fields such as family policy and so would have been of no interest to the Soviets.

The person who is regarded as having recruited her to the communists, Bernard Floud, interviewed by Wright shortly after, maintained that he was unable to remember ever having done so. Nor was her husband in a position to convey to her information of use, given the sharp separation of his work from that of foreign affairs and its focus on German spies and British turncoats rather than on matters related to the Soviet ally. In fact, Hart was anticommunist.

=== World War II ===
On the recommendation of Williams, Hart was recruited to work for MI5 during World War II, a division of British military intelligence concerned with unearthing spies who had penetrated Britain, where he renewed Oxford friendships including working with the philosophers Gilbert Ryle and Stuart Hampshire. He worked closely with Dick White, later head of MI5 and then of MI6. Hart worked at Bletchley Park and was a colleague of the mathematician and codebreaker Alan Turing.

Hart's war work took him on occasion to MI5 offices at Blenheim Palace, family home of the Dukes of Marlborough and the place where Winston Churchill had been born. He enjoyed telling the story that there he was able to read the diaries of Sarah Churchill, Duchess of Marlborough, wife of the founder of the dynasty John Churchill, 1st Duke of Marlborough. Hart's wit and humanity are demonstrated by the fact that he particularly enjoyed the passage where Sarah reports that John had been away for a long time, had arrived suddenly, and "enjoyed me straight way in his boots". Another incident at Blenheim that Hart enjoyed recounting was that he shared an office with one of the famous Cambridge spies, Anthony Blunt, a fellow member of MI5. Hart wondered which of the papers on his desk Blunt had managed to read and to pass on to his Soviet controllers.

== Academic career ==
Hart standing at the entrance to New College, Oxford

Hart did not return to legal practice after the war, preferring instead to accept the offer of a teaching fellowship in philosophy at New College, Oxford. Among his intellectual influences at the time were J. L. Austin and Ludwig Wittgenstein, with Hart's work concentrating in the fields of natural language philosophy and conceptual analysis. Hart and Austin two jointly taught from 1948 a seminar on 'Legal and Moral Responsibility'. Among Hart's publications at this time were the essays 'A Logician's Fairytale', 'Is There Knowledge by Acquaintance?', 'Law and Fact' and 'The Ascription of Responsibility and Rights'.

In 1952, despite having only published a few essays, Hart was elected Professor of Jurisprudence at Oxford and was a fellow at University College, Oxford, from 1952 to 1973. It was in the summer of that year that he began writing his most famous book, The Concept of Law, though it was not published until 1961. In the interim, he published another major work, Causation in the Law (with Tony Honoré) (1959). He was president of the Aristotelian Society from 1959 to 1960. He gave the 1962 Master-Mind Lecture. In 1966, he was offered a knighthood, but declined it.

=== Teaching ===
Many of Hart's former students have become important legal, moral, and political philosophers, including Brian Barry, Ronald Dworkin, John Finnis, John Gardner, Kent Greenawalt, Peter Hacker, David Hodgson, Neil MacCormick, Joseph Raz, Chin Liew Ten, and William Twining. Hart also had a strong influence on a young John Rawls in the 1950s, when Rawls was a visiting scholar at Oxford shortly after finishing his PhD.

=== Debates ===
As a result of his famous debate (Hart–Devlin debate) with Patrick Devlin, on the role of the criminal law in enforcing moral norms, Hart wrote Law, Liberty and Morality (1963), which consisted of three lectures he gave at Stanford University. He also wrote The Morality of the Criminal Law (1965). Hart said that he believed Devlin's view of Mill's harm principle as it related to the decriminalisation of homosexuality was "perverse". He later stated that he believed the reforms to the law regarding homosexuality that followed the Wolfenden report "didn't go far enough". Despite this, Hart reported later that he got on well personally with Devlin.

Significant in the differences between Hart and Kelsen was the emphasis on the British version of positive law theory which Hart was defending as opposed to the Continental version of positive law theory which Kelsen was defending. This was studied in the University of Toronto Law Journal in an article titled "Leaving the Hart–Dworkin Debate" which maintained that Hart insisted in his book The Concept of Law on the expansive reading of positive law theory to include philosophical and sociological domains of assessment rather than the more focused attention of Kelsen who considered Continental positive law theory as more limited to the domain of jurisprudence itself.

A third debate that Hart was involved in was the Hart–Fuller debate with Lon Fuller.

=== Retirement and death ===
Hart retired from the Chair of Jurisprudence in 1969 and was succeeded by the legal interpretivist Ronald Dworkin, a contemporaneous critic of Hart's legal positivism, who had Hart's full support for the role. In 1955, Hart had marked the papers of Dworkin whilst the latter was an undergraduate law student in Oxford, finding his work remarkable and challenging to his own research. He subsequently became principal of Brasenose College, Oxford. Hart died in Oxford on 19 December 1992, aged 85. He is buried there in Wolvercote Cemetery, which also contains Isaiah Berlin's grave.

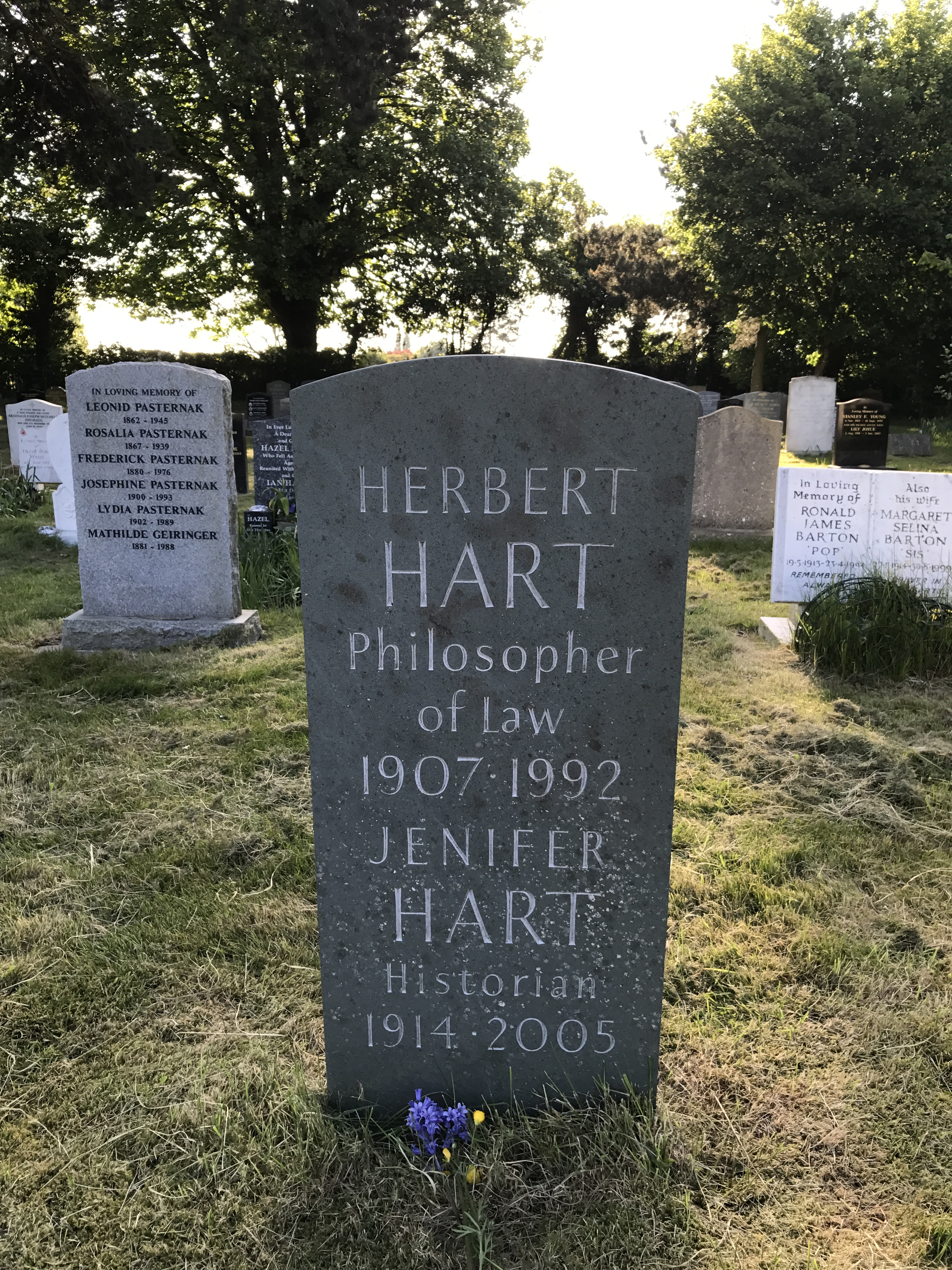
Grave of H. L. A. Hart at the Wolvercote Cemetery in Oxford

== Legacy and influence ==
Hart was the founder of jurisprudence as a field for analytic philosophy in the second half of the 20th century. He re-created the subject, posed the central questions, and started a great flood of work by others which has not ceased with his death. Along with John Rawls, he initiated the vastly influential tradition within analytic philosophy of substantive moral exploration of major public issues, bringing high standards of clarity, rational argument and lucid expression to questions that matter to many more people than the abstract problems of metaphysics, epistemology and logic with which the analytic movement began. — Thomas Nagel (2005)

Hart's research was influential in the understanding of legal causation, legal positivism (including the relationship between positive law and morality), culpability, liability, utilitarianism (in particular, the work of Jeremy Bentham), and political philosophy.

Hart's conception of law had parallels to the Pure Theory of Law formulated by Austrian legal philosopher Hans Kelsen, though Hart rejected several distinctive features of Kelsen's theory.

=== The Concept of law ===
Hart's most famous work is The Concept of Law, first published in 1961, and with a second edition (including a new postscript) published posthumously in 1994. The book emerged from a set of lectures that Hart began to deliver in 1952, and it is presaged by his Holmes lecture, Positivism and the Separation of Law and Morals, delivered at Harvard Law School. The Concept of Law developed a sophisticated view of legal positivism.

In the last chapter of The Concept of Law (1961), Hart argued that the use in respect of different social phenomena of an abstract word like law reflected the fact that these phenomena each shared, without necessarily all possessing in common, some distinctive features. Glanville had himself said as much when editing a student text on jurisprudence and he had adopted essentially the same approach to "The Definition of Crime".

=== Causation in the law ===
With Tony Honoré, Hart wrote and published Causation in the Law (1959, second edition 1985), which is regarded as one of the important academic discussions of causation in the legal context.

== Personal life ==
According to his diaries, and his posthumous biography published by LSE law professor Nicola Lacey, Hart was a repressed homosexual. At one point, he had joked with his daughter that he did not enjoy sex with his wife. At the same time, Jenifer Hart had had multiple affairs during the marriage, including one of long duration with Isaiah Berlin, a close friend of Hart's. At the age of 76, Hart received electroshock therapy after a Sunday Times article had accused him of espionage, on the basis of his wife's ties to the communist party. In 1998, Jenifer Hart published Ask Me No More: An Autobiography.

Hart gave lectures to the Labour Party on closing tax loopholes which were being used by the "super-rich". Hart considered himself to be "on the Left, the non-communist Left", and expressed animosity towards Margaret Thatcher.

The Harts had four children, including, late in life, a son who was disabled, the umbilical cord wrapped around his neck having deprived his brain of oxygen. Hart's granddaughter Mojo Mathers became New Zealand's first deaf Member of Parliament in 2011.

== Writings ==
- "The Ascription of Responsibility and Rights", Proceedings of the Aristotelian Society (1949)
- Definition and Theory in Jurisprudence (1953)
- Causation in the Law (with Tony Honoré) (Clarendon Press, 1959)
- The Concept of Law (Clarendon Press, 1961; 2nd ed. 1994; 3rd ed. 2012)
- Law, Liberty, and Morality (Stanford University Press, 1963)
- The Morality of the Criminal Law (Oxford University Press, 1964)
- Punishment and Responsibility (Oxford University Press, 1968)
- Essays on Bentham: Studies in Jurisprudence and Political Theory (Clarendon Press, 1982)
- Essays in Jurisprudence and Philosophy (Oxford University Press, 1983)

=== Festschrift ===
- Law, Morality, and Society: Essays in Honour of H. L. A. Hart, edited by P. M. S. Hacker and Joseph Raz (1977)

== See also ==
- Legal interpretivism
- Lon L. Fuller
- Natural law

== Sources ==
- Nicola Lacey, A Life of H. L. A. Hart: The Nightmare and the Noble Dream, Oxford University Press: 2004 ISBN 0199274975
- Frederick Schauer, "(Re)Taking Hart," 119 Harv. L. Rev. 852 (2006) (reviewing Lacey, A Life of H. L. A. Hart)
- Karen Armstrong, The Spiral Staircase, Harper Collins, 2004 ISBN 0007122284
- Carlin Romano, "A Philosopher's Humanity", Chronicle of Higher Education vol. 51 (2005) (reviewing Lacey, A Life of H. L. A. Hart) link
- Matthew Kramer, H.L.A. Hart: The Nature of Law, Polity: 2018 ISBN 1509520732

Academic offices
Preceded by Arthur Lehman Goodhart	Professor of Jurisprudence at the University of Oxford; 1952–1968	Succeeded by Ronald Dworkin
Preceded by Noel Frederick Hall	Principal of Brasenose College, Oxford; 1973–1978	Succeeded by Barry Nicholas
Professional and academic associations
Preceded by Karl Popper	President of the Aristotelian Society; 1959–1960	Succeeded by Austin Duncan-Jones
Preceded by Ronald Syme	Master-Mind Lecturer; 1962	Succeeded by John Summerson
