= Rule of recognition =

Meta-legal rule that defines what counts as valid law

The rule of recognition is a master meta-rule underlying any legal system that defines the common identifying test for legal validity (or "what counts as law") within that system, and forms a central part of H. L. A. Hart's theory of legal positivism. Hart describes the rule of recognition as a "secondary rule", or a "rule about rules", which describes how other "primary rules" of obligation (which generate reasons for action) can be identified. A primary rule may stipulate that "one should not kill", but the secondary rule of recognition provides the criteria by which that rule is identified as legally valid within a particular legal system. For example, if the rule of recognition provides that "whatever the Queen-in-Parliament enacts is law", then "one should not kill" will only be a valid legal rule if enacted by the Queen-in-Parliament. Hart describes the rule of recognition in The Concept of Law as follows:

...to say that a given rule is valid is to recognize it as passing all the tests provided by the rule of recognition and so as a rule of the system. We can simply say that the statement that a particular rule is valid means that it satisfies all the criteria provided by the rule of recognition.

In Hart's view, the rule of recognition arises out of a social convention among officials by which they accept the rule's criteria as standards that impose duties and confer powers on officials, and resolves doubts and disagreements within the community. The rule is cognizable from the social practices of officials acknowledging the rule as a legitimate standard of behavior, exerting social pressure on one another to conform to it, and generally satisfying the rule's requirements.

Officials conform and exert pressure on one another to adopt a given rule of recognition because they hold the "internal point of view" of that legal system. Those who hold the internal point of view of a particular social or legal practice accept its rules as common standards of conduct, and criticise those who deviate from those standards. The rule of recognition therefore exists as a social rule through the convergent practice of officials who accept and apply it as a common standard for identifying legally valid rules. Its existence is thus a matter of social fact, rather than a question of its own legal validity.

To this end, as explained by Hart, the rule has three functions:

- To establish a test for valid law in the applicable legal system
- To confer validity to everything else in the applicable legal system
- To unify the laws in the applicable legal system

The validity of a legal system is independent from its efficacy. A completely ineffective rule may be a valid one as long as it emanates from the rule of recognition. But to be a valid rule, the legal system of which the rule is a component must, as a whole, be effective.

It follows that the exercise of the rule of recognition is but a factual acknowledgement of what is indeed law; as per the classic illustration of a bill passed by the legislative authority and assented to by a head-of-state. The fact that the bill has been made law in accordance with proper parliamentary procedure shall, in accordance with the rule of recognition, render it valid law. Again, this is primarily based on the fact of its existence in such manner. The judgment in R (Factortame Ltd) v Secretary of State for Transport (decided March 1989 to November 2000) represents an alteration of the rule of recognition, by confirming the incompatibility of UK legislation (the Merchant Shipping Act) with EU law, and deciding that the provisions of such law were to be disapplied by the UK courts if they contravened EU law. Sir William Wade, a renowned authority in British constitutional law, would confirm this view. Following Brexit, however, this view would maintain significance only as part of legal history.

== Criticism ==
A criticism of Hart's rule of recognition is that it is not definitively possible to recognize a rule as having passed "...all the tests provided by the rule of recognition," whereby reliance upon defeasible reasoning as justification that a rule has passed "...all the tests provided by the rule of recognition..." may be fallible.

As per Dworkin in "The Model of Rules" (1967), "..a rule of recognition cannot itself be valid, because by hypothesis it is ultimate, and so cannot meet tests stipulated by a more fundamental rule..."

== See also ==
- The Concept of Law
- Indeterminacy debate in legal theory
