= Law =

System of enforceable rules

Law is a set of rules that are created and enforced by governmental or societal institutions to regulate behavior, with its precise definition a matter of longstanding debate. It has been variously described as a science and as the art of justice. State-enforced laws can be made by a legislature, resulting in statutes; by the executive through decrees and regulations; or by judges' decisions, which form precedent in common law jurisdictions. An autocrat may exercise those functions within their realm. The creation of laws themselves may be influenced by a constitution, written or tacit, and the rights encoded therein. The law shapes politics, economics, history, and society in various ways and also serves as a mediator of relations between people.

Legal systems vary between jurisdictions, with their differences analysed in comparative law. In civil law jurisdictions, a legislature or other central body codifies and consolidates the law. In common law systems, judges may make binding case law through precedent, although on occasion this may be overturned by a higher court or the legislature. Religious law is in use in some religious communities and states, and has historically influenced secular law.

The scope of law can be divided into two domains: public law concerns government and society, including constitutional law, administrative law, and criminal law; private law deals with legal disputes between parties in areas such as contracts, property, torts, delicts and commercial law. This distinction is stronger in civil law countries, particularly those with a separate system of administrative courts; by contrast, the public-private law divide is less pronounced in common law jurisdictions.

Law provides a source of scholarly inquiry into legal history, philosophy, economic analysis and sociology. Law also raises important and complex issues concerning equality, fairness, and justice.

== Etymology ==
The word law, attested in Old English as lagu, comes from the Old Norse word lǫg. The singular form lag meant 'something laid or fixed' while its plural meant 'law'.

== Philosophy of law ==
But what, after all, is a law? [...] When I say that the object of laws is always general, I mean that law considers subjects en masse and actions in the abstract, and never a particular person or action. [...] On this view, we at once see that it can no longer be asked whose business it is to make laws, since they are acts of the general will; nor whether the prince is above the law, since he is a member of the State; nor whether the law can be unjust, since no one is unjust to himself; nor how we can be both free and subject to the laws, since they are but registers of our wills.

— Jean-Jacques Rousseau, The Social Contract, II, 6.

The philosophy of law is commonly known as jurisprudence. Normative jurisprudence asks "what should law be?", while analytic jurisprudence asks "what is law?"

=== Analytical jurisprudence ===
There have been several attempts to produce "a universally acceptable definition of law". In 1972, Baron Hampstead suggested that no such definition could be produced. McCoubrey and White said that the question "what is law?" has no simple answer. Glanville Williams said that the meaning of the word "law" depends on the context in which that word is used. He said that, for example, "early customary law" and "municipal law" were contexts where the word "law" had two different and irreconcilable meanings. Thurman Arnold said that it is obvious that it is impossible to define the word "law" and that it is also equally obvious that the struggle to define that word should not ever be abandoned. It is possible to take the view that there is no need to define the word "law" (e.g. "let's forget about generalities and get down to cases").

One definition is that law is a system of rules and guidelines enforced by social institutions to govern behaviour. In The Concept of Law, H. L. A. Hart argued that law is a "system of rules"; John Austin said law was "the command of a sovereign, backed by the threat of a sanction"; Ronald Dworkin describes law as an "interpretive concept" to achieve justice in his text titled Law's Empire; and Joseph Raz argues law is an "authority" to mediate people's interests. Oliver Wendell Holmes defined law as "the prophecies of what the courts will do in fact, and nothing more pretentious." In his Treatise on Law, Thomas Aquinas argues that law is a rational ordering of things, which concern the common good, that is promulgated by whoever is charged with the care of the community. This definition has both positivist and naturalist elements.

=== Connection to morality and justice ===
Definitions of law often raise the question of the extent to which law incorporates morality. John Austin's utilitarian answer was that law is "commands, backed by threat of sanctions, from a sovereign, to whom people have a habit of obedience". Natural lawyers, on the other hand, such as Jean-Jacques Rousseau, argue that law reflects essentially moral and unchangeable laws of nature. The concept of "natural law" emerged in ancient Greek philosophy concurrently and in connection with the notion of justice, and re-entered the mainstream of Western culture through the writings of Thomas Aquinas, notably his Treatise on Law.

Hugo Grotius, the founder of a purely rationalistic system of natural law, argued that law arises from both a social impulse—as Aristotle had indicated—and reason. Immanuel Kant believed a moral imperative requires laws "be chosen as though they should hold as universal laws of nature". Jeremy Bentham and his student Austin, following David Hume, believed that this conflated the "is" and what "ought to be" problem. Bentham and Austin argued for law's positivism; that real law is entirely separate from "morality". Kant was also criticised by Friedrich Nietzsche, who rejected the principle of equality, and believed that law emanates from the will to power, and cannot be labeled as "moral" or "immoral".

In 1934, the Austrian philosopher Hans Kelsen continued the positivist tradition in his book the Pure Theory of Law. Kelsen believed that although law is separate from morality, it is endowed with "normativity", meaning we ought to obey it. While laws are positive "is" statements (e.g., the fine for reversing on a highway is €500), laws tell us what we "should" do. Thus, each legal system can be hypothesised to have a 'basic norm' (German: Grundnorm) instructing us to obey. Kelsen's major opponent, Carl Schmitt, rejected both positivism and the idea of the rule of law because he did not accept the primacy of abstract normative principles over concrete political positions and decisions. Therefore, Schmitt advocated a jurisprudence of the exception (state of emergency), which denied that legal norms could encompass all of the political experience.

Later in the 20th century, H. L. A. Hart attacked Austin for his simplifications and Kelsen for his fiction in The Concept of Law. Hart argued law is a system of rules, divided into primary (rules of conduct) and secondary ones (rules addressed to officials to administer primary rules). Secondary rules are further divided into rules of adjudication (to resolve legal disputes), rules of change (to vary laws), and the rule of recognition (to identify laws as valid). Two of Hart's students continued the debate: In his book Law's Empire, Ronald Dworkin attacked Hart and the positivists for their refusal to treat law as a moral issue. Dworkin argues that law is an "interpretive concept" that requires judges to find the best fitting and most just solution to a legal dispute, given their Anglo-American constitutional traditions. Joseph Raz, on the other hand, defended the positivist outlook and criticised Hart's "soft social thesis" approach in The Authority of Law. Raz argues that law is authority, identifiable purely through social sources and without reference to moral reasoning. In his view, any categorisation of rules beyond their role as authoritative instruments in mediation is best left to sociology rather than to jurisprudence.

== History ==
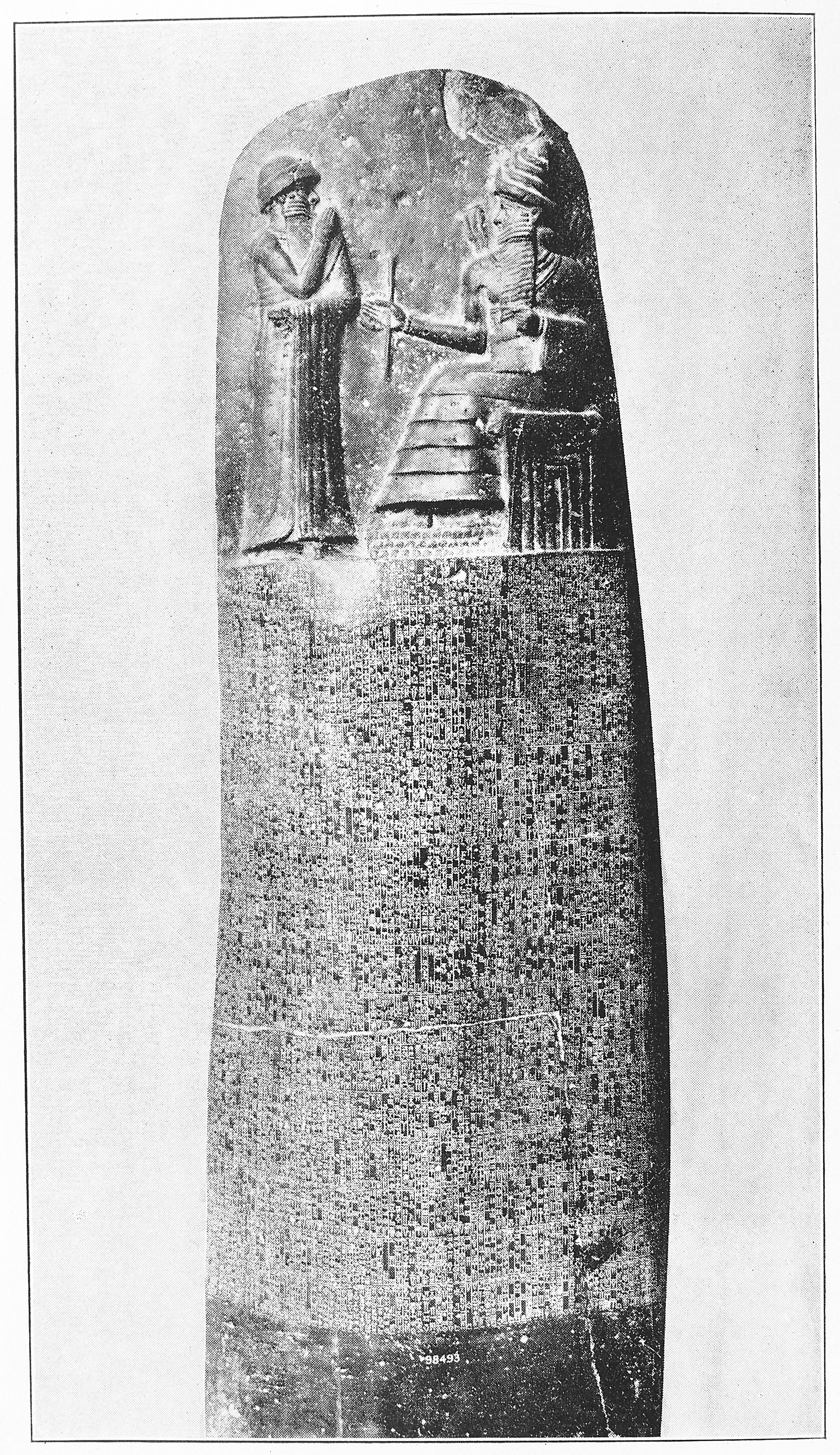
The Code of Hammurabi is an early code of laws, from ancient Babylon.

The history of law is closely linked to the development of civilization. Ancient Egyptian law, dating as far back as 3000 BC, was based on the concept of Ma'at and characterised by tradition, rhetorical speech, social equality and impartiality. By the 22nd century BC, the ancient Sumerian ruler Ur-Nammu had formulated the first law code, which consisted of casuistic statements ("if … then ..."). Around 1760 BC, King Hammurabi further developed Babylonian law by codifying and inscribing it in stone. Hammurabi placed several copies of his law code throughout the kingdom of Babylon as stelae, for the entire public to see; this became known as the Codex Hammurabi. The most intact copy of these stelae was discovered in the 19th century by British Assyriologists, and has since been fully transliterated and translated into various languages, including English, Italian, German, and French.

The Old Testament dates back to 1280 BC and presents moral imperatives as recommendations for a good society. The small Greek city-state, ancient Athens, from about the 8th century BC was the first society to be based on broad inclusion of its citizenry, excluding women and enslaved people. However, Athens had no legal science or single word for "law", relying instead on the three-way distinction between divine law (thémis), human decree (nómos), and custom (díkē). Yet Ancient Greek law contained major constitutional innovations in the development of democracy.

Roman law was heavily influenced by Greek philosophy, but professional jurists developed its detailed rules and were highly sophisticated. Over the centuries between the rise and decline of the Roman Empire, law was adapted to cope with the changing social situations and underwent major codification under Theodosius II and Justinian I. (Note: As a legal system, Roman law has affected the development of law worldwide. It also forms the basis of the legal codes of most countries in continental Europe; it has played an important role in the development of the idea of a common European culture (Stein, Roman Law in European History, 2, 104–107).) Although codes were replaced by custom and case law during the Early Middle Ages, Roman law was rediscovered around the 11th century when medieval legal scholars began to research Roman codes and adapt their concepts to the canon law, giving birth to the jus commune. Latin legal maxims (called brocards) were compiled for guidance. In medieval England, royal courts developed a body of precedent which later became the common law. A Europe-wide Law Merchant was established so that merchants could trade under common standards of practice rather than the many splintered facets of local laws. The Law Merchant, a precursor to modern commercial law, emphasised the freedom to contract and the alienability of property. As nationalism grew in the 18th and 19th centuries, the Law Merchant was incorporated into countries' local law under new civil codes. The Napoleonic and German Codes became the most influential. In contrast to English common law, which consists of enormous tomes of case law, codes in small books are easy to export and easy for judges to apply. However, today there are signs that civil and common law are converging. EU law is codified in treaties, but develops through de facto precedents laid down by the European Court of Justice.

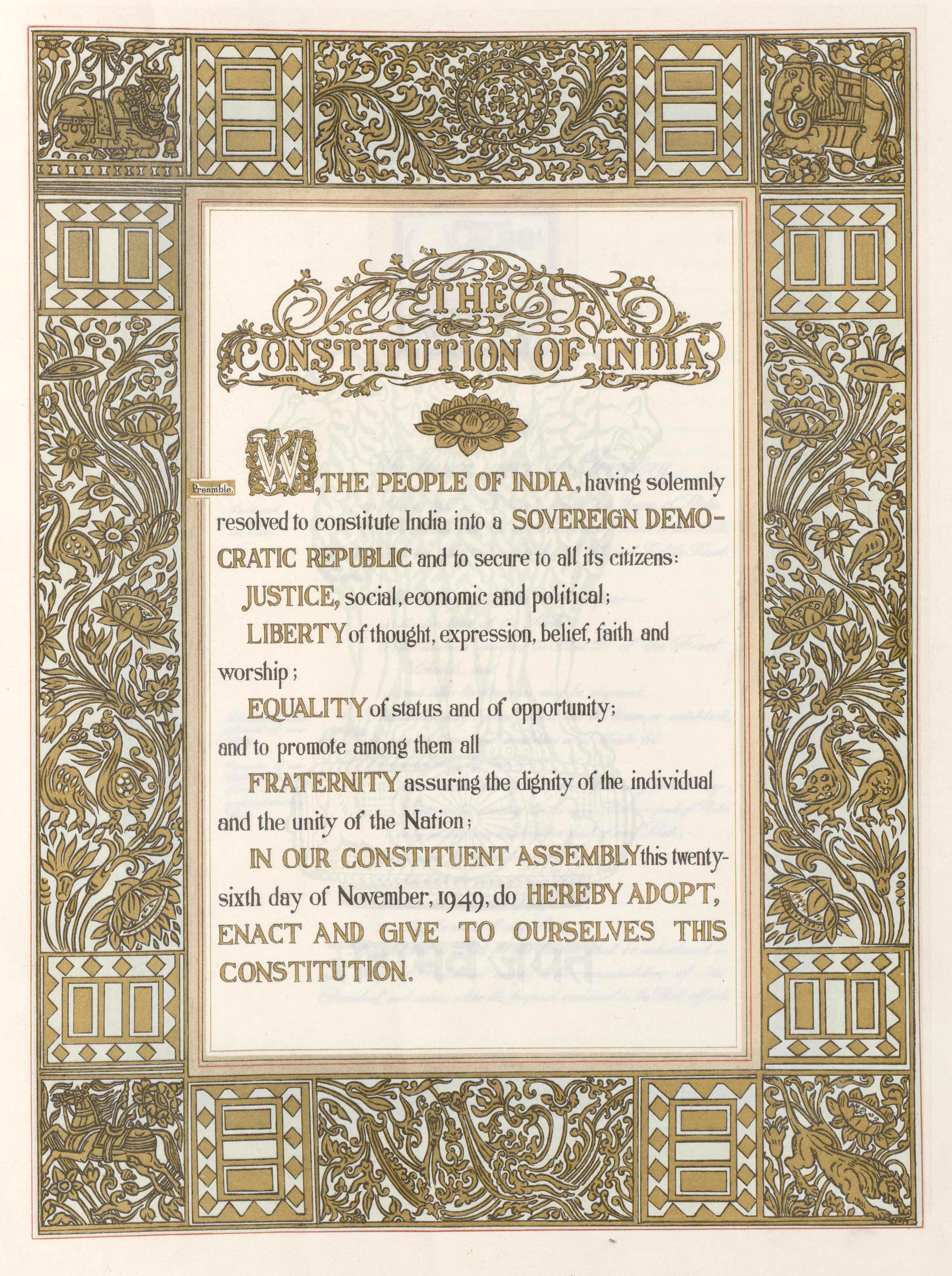
The Constitution of India, ceremonially rendered as an illustrated and calligraphed manuscript.

Ancient India and China represent distinct legal traditions and have historically had independent schools of legal theory and practice. The Arthashastra, probably compiled around 100 AD (although it contains older material), and the Manusmriti (c. 100–300 AD) were foundational treatises in India, and comprise texts considered authoritative legal guidance. Manu's central philosophy was tolerance and pluralism, and was cited across Southeast Asia. During the Muslim conquests in the Indian subcontinent, sharia was established by the Muslim sultanates and empires, most notably Mughal Empire's Fatawa-e-Alamgiri, compiled by emperor Aurangzeb and various scholars of Islam. In India, the Hindu legal tradition, along with Islamic law, were both supplanted by common law when India became part of the British Empire. Malaysia, Brunei, Singapore and Hong Kong also adopted the common law system. The Eastern Asian legal tradition reflects a unique blend of secular and religious influences. Japan was the first country to begin modernising its legal system along Western lines, by importing parts of the French, but mostly the German Civil Code. This partly reflected Germany's status as a rising power in the late 19th century.

Similarly, traditional Chinese law gave way to westernisation in the final years of the Qing Dynasty, in the form of six private law codes based mainly on the Japanese model of German law. Today Taiwanese law retains the closest affinity to the codifications from that period, because of the split between Chiang Kai-shek's nationalists, who fled there, and Mao Zedong's communists who won control of the mainland in 1949. The current legal infrastructure in the People's Republic of China was heavily influenced by Soviet Socialist law, which essentially prioritises administrative law over private law rights. Due to rapid industrialisation, today China is undergoing a process of reform, at least in terms of economic, if not social and political, rights. A new contract code introduced in 1999 marked a shift away from administrative domination. Furthermore, after negotiations lasting fifteen years, in 2001 China joined the World Trade Organization.

== Legal systems ==
In general, legal systems can be split between civil law and common law systems. Modern scholars argue that the significance of this distinction has progressively declined. The numerous legal transplants, typical of modern law, result in the sharing of many features traditionally associated with either common law or civil law. The third type of legal system is religious law, based on scriptures. The specific system by which a country is ruled is often determined by its history, its connections with other countries, or its adherence to international standards. The sources that jurisdictions adopt as authoritatively binding are the defining features of any legal system.

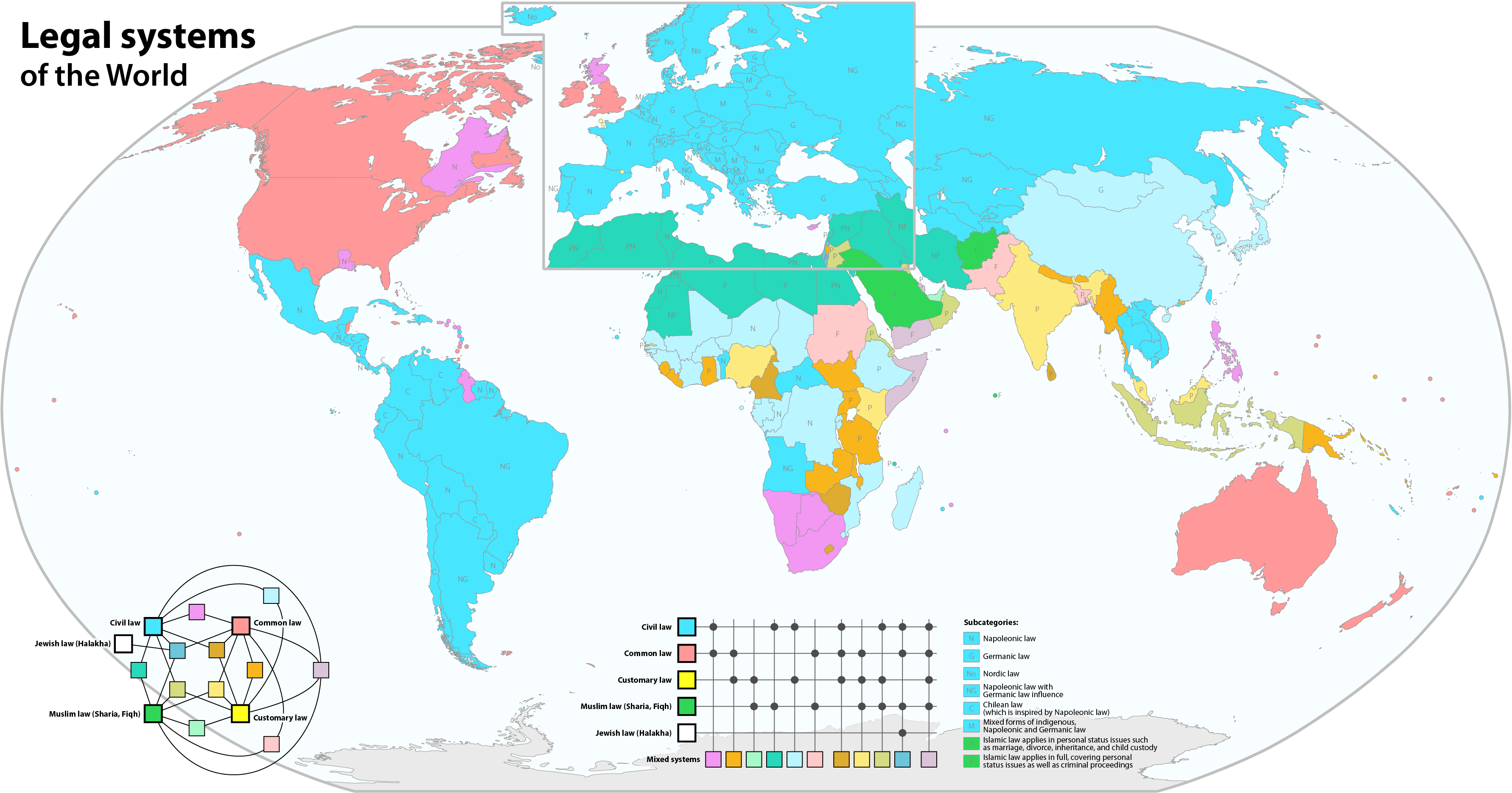
Colour-coded map of the legal systems around the world, showing civil, common law, religious, customary, and mixed legal systems. Common law systems are shaded pink, and civil law systems are shaded blue/turquoise.

=== Civil law ===
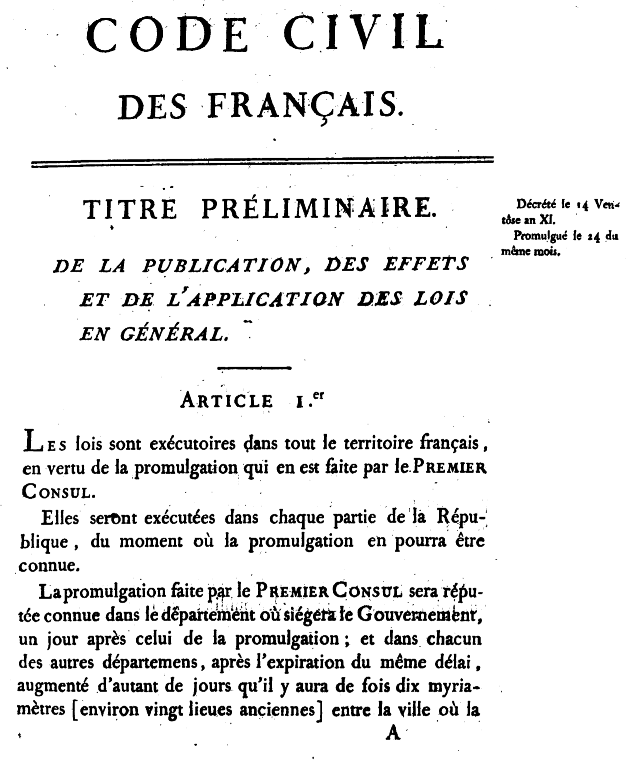
First page of the 1804 edition of the Napoleonic Code

Civil law is the legal system used in most countries around the world today. In civil law the sources recognised as authoritative are, primarily, legislation—especially codifications in constitutions or statutes passed by government—and custom. (Note: Civil law jurisdictions recognise custom as "the other source of law"; hence, scholars tend to divide the civil law into the broad categories of "written law" (ius scriptum) or legislation, and "unwritten law" (ius non-scriptum) or custom. Yet they tend to dismiss custom as being of slight importance compared to legislation (Georgiadis, General Principles of Civil Law, 19; Washofsky, Taking Precedent Seriously, 7).) Codifications date back millennia, with one early example being the Babylonian Codex Hammurabi. Modern civil law systems essentially derive from legal codes issued by Byzantine Emperor Justinian I in the 6th century, which were rediscovered by 11th-century Italy. Roman law in the days of the Roman Republic and Empire was heavily procedural, and lacked a professional legal class. Instead a lay magistrate, iudex, was chosen to adjudicate. Decisions were not published systematically, so any case law that developed was obscured and almost unrecognised. Each case was to be decided afresh from the laws of the State, which mirrors the (theoretical) unimportance of judges' decisions for future cases in civil law systems today. From 529 to 534 AD, the Byzantine Emperor Justinian I codified and consolidated Roman law up until that point, so that what remained was one-twentieth of the mass of legal texts from before. This became known as the Corpus Juris Civilis. As one legal historian wrote, "Justinian consciously looked back to the golden age of Roman law and aimed to restore it to the peak it had reached three centuries before." The Justinian Code remained in force in the East until the fall of the Byzantine Empire. Western Europe, meanwhile, relied on a mix of the Theodosian Code and Germanic customary law until the Justinian Code was rediscovered in the 11th century, which scholars at the University of Bologna used to interpret their own laws. Civil law codifications, based closely on Roman law and influenced by religious laws such as canon law, continued to spread throughout Europe until the Enlightenment. Then, in the 19th century, both France, with the Code Civil, and Germany, with the Bürgerliches Gesetzbuch, modernised their legal codes. Both these codes heavily influenced not only the law systems of the countries in continental Europe but also the Japanese and Korean legal traditions. A central doctrine in continental European legal thinking, originating in German jurisprudence, is the concept of a Rechtsstaat, meaning that everyone is subjected to the law, especially governments. Today, countries that have civil law systems range from Russia and Turkey to most of Central and Latin America.

=== Common law and equity ===
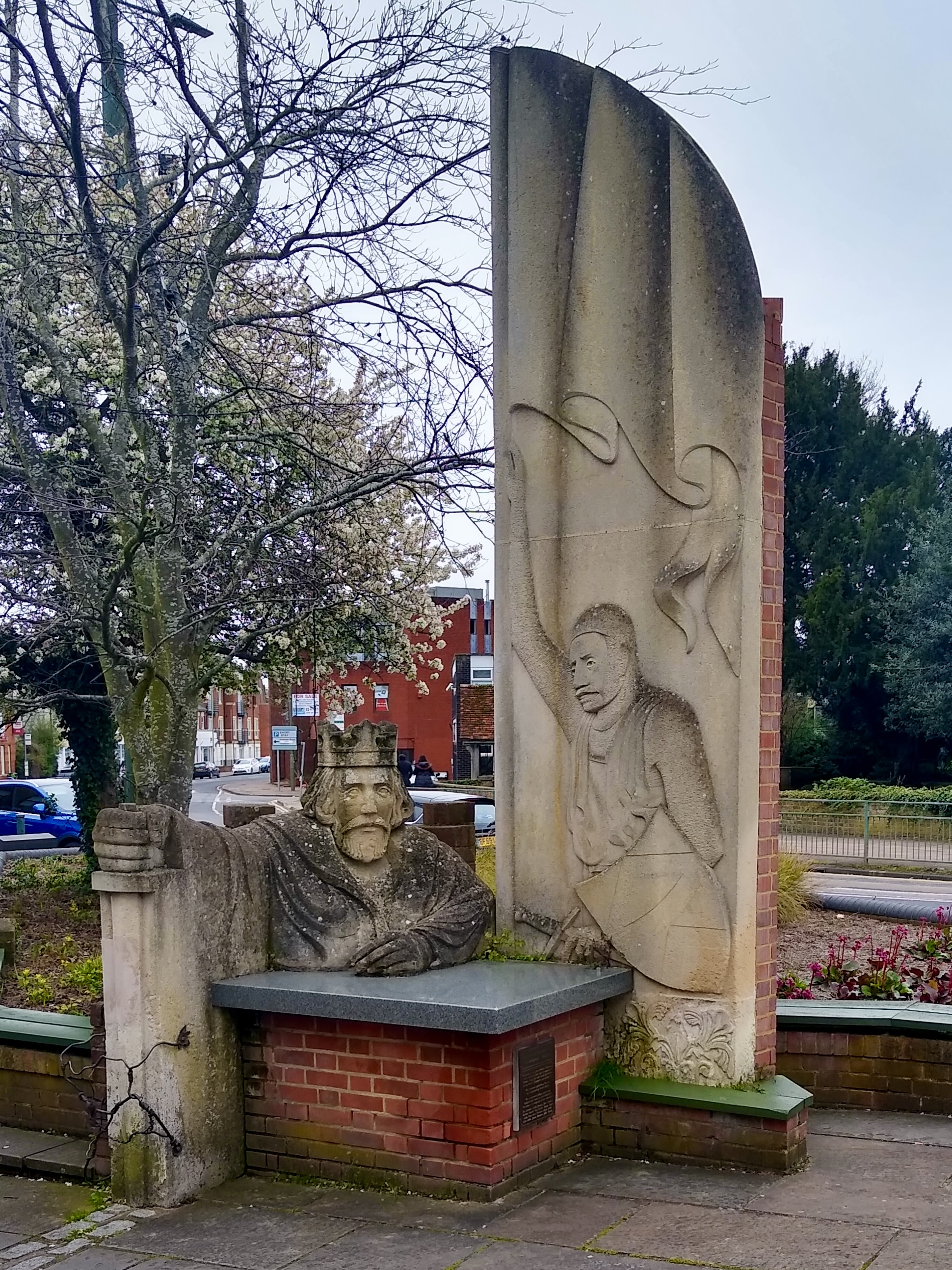
English memorial to the sealing of Magna Carta by King John

In common law legal systems, decisions by courts are explicitly acknowledged as law on equal footing with legislative statutes and executive regulations. The doctrine of precedent, or stare decisis (Latin for "to stand by decisions"), means that decisions by higher courts bind lower courts to assure that similar cases reach similar results. In contrast, in civil law systems, legislative statutes are typically more detailed. Judicial decisions are shorter and less detailed because the adjudicator is writing only to decide a single case, rather than to set out reasoning that will guide future courts.

Common law originated from England and has been inherited by almost every country once tied to the British Empire (except Malta, Scotland, the U.S. state of Louisiana, and the Canadian province of Quebec). In medieval England during the Norman Conquest, the law varied from shire to shire, reflecting disparate tribal customs. The concept of a common law developed during the reign of Henry II during the late 12th century, when Henry appointed judges who had the authority to create an institutionalised and unified system of law common to the country. The next major step in the evolution of the common law came when King John was forced by his barons to agree to a document limiting his authority to pass laws. The Magna Carta ("great charter") of 1215 also required that the King's entourage of judges hold their courts and judgments at "a certain place" rather than dispensing autocratic justice in unpredictable places about the country. A concentrated and elite group of judges acquired a dominant role in law-making under this system, and compared to its European counterparts, the English judiciary became highly centralised. In 1297, for instance, while the highest court in France had fifty-one judges, the English Court of Common Pleas had five. This powerful and tight-knit judiciary gave rise to a systematised process of developing common law.

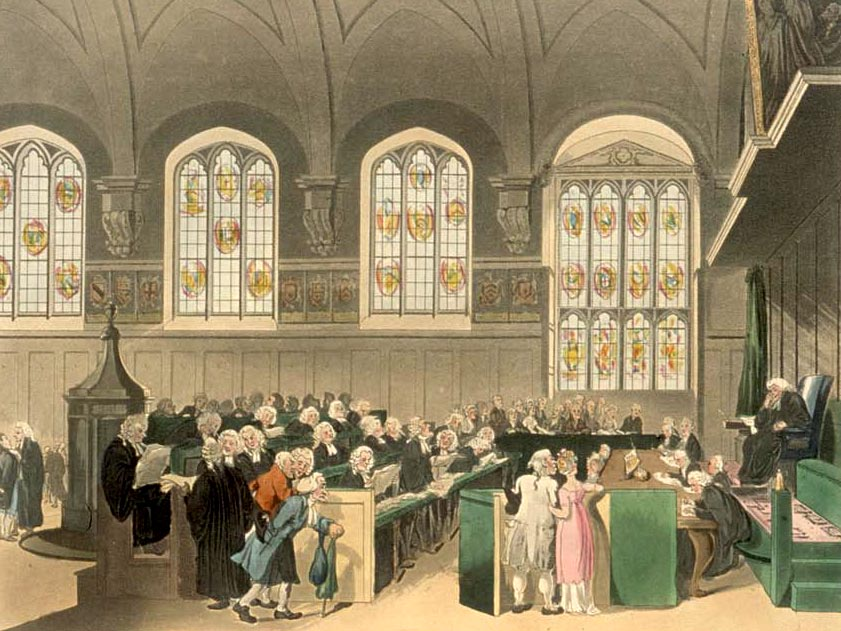
The Court of Chancery, London, England, early 19th century

As time went on, many felt that the common law was overly systematised and inflexible, and an increasing number of citizens petitioned the King to override it. On the King's behalf, the Lord Chancellor started giving judgments to do what was equitable in a case. From the time of Sir Thomas More, the first lawyer to be appointed as Lord Chancellor, a systematic body of equity grew up alongside the rigid common law, and developed its own Court of Chancery. At first, equity was often criticised for its erratic behavior. Over time, courts of equity developed solid principles, especially under Lord Eldon. In the 19th century in England, and in 1937 in the U.S., the two systems were merged.

In developing the common law, academic writings have always played an important role, both in collecting overarching principles from scattered case law and in advocating change. William Blackstone, from around 1760, was the first scholar to collect, describe, and teach the common law. But merely in describing, scholars who sought explanations and underlying structures slowly changed the way the law actually worked.

=== Religious law ===
Religious law is explicitly based on religious precepts. Examples include the Jewish Halakha and Islamic Sharia—both of which translate as the "path to follow". Christian canon law also survives in some church communities. Often, the implication of religion for law is unalterability because the word of God cannot be amended or legislated against by judges or governments. Nonetheless, most religious jurisdictions rely on further human elaboration to provide for thorough and detailed legal systems. For instance, the Quran has some law, and it acts as a source of further law through interpretation, Qiyas (reasoning by analogy), Ijma (consensus), and precedent. This is mainly contained in a body of law and jurisprudence known as Sharia and Fiqh respectively. Another example is the Torah or Old Testament, in the Pentateuch or Five Books of Moses. This contains the basic code of Jewish law, which some Israeli communities choose to use. The Halakha is a code of Jewish law that summarizes some of the Talmud's interpretations.

Many countries are Sharia jurisdictions. Israeli law allows litigants to use religious laws only if they choose. Canon law is only in use by members of the Catholic Church, the Eastern Orthodox Church, and the Anglican Communion.

==== Canon law ====
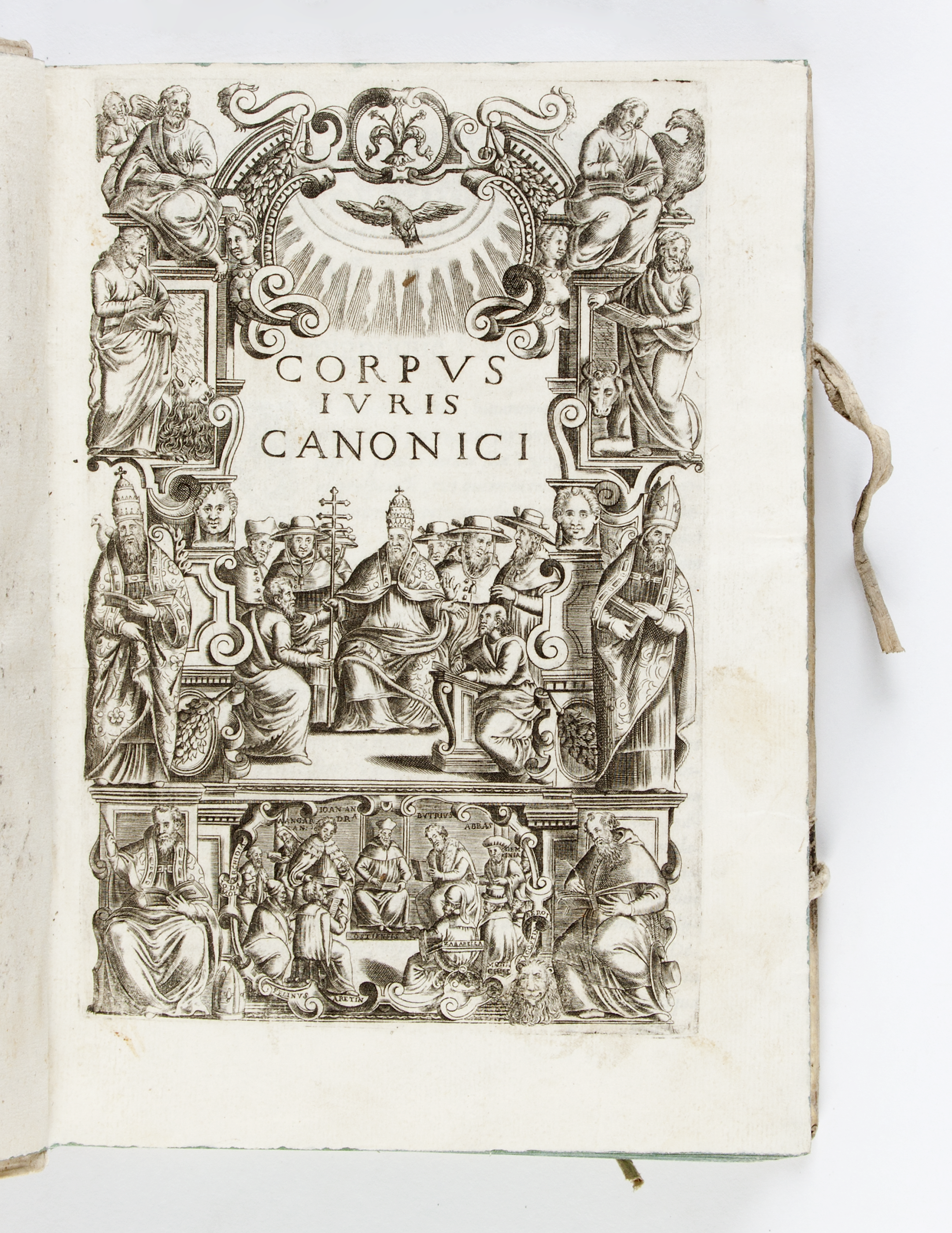
The Corpus Juris Canonici, the fundamental collection of canon law for over 750 years

Canon law (Ancient Greek: κανών, romanized: kanon, lit. 'a straight measuring rod; a ruler') is a set of ordinances and regulations made by ecclesiastical authority, for the government of a Christian organisation or church and its members. It is the internal ecclesiastical law governing the Catholic Church, the Eastern Orthodox Church, the Oriental Orthodox Churches, and the individual national churches within the Anglican Communion. The way that such church law is legislated, interpreted and at times adjudicated varies widely among these three bodies of churches. In all three traditions, a canon was originally a rule adopted by a church council; these canons formed the foundation of canon law.

The Catholic Church has the oldest continuously functioning legal system in the western world, predating the evolution of modern European civil law and common law systems. The 1983 Code of Canon Law governs the Latin Church sui juris. The Eastern Catholic Churches, which developed different disciplines and practices, are governed by the Code of Canons of the Eastern Churches. The canon law of the Catholic Church influenced the common law during the medieval period through its preservation of Roman law doctrine, such as the presumption of innocence. (Note: «In one of his elaborate orations in the United States Senate Mr. Charles Sumner spoke of "the generous presumption of the common law in favor of the innocence of an accused person;" yet it must be admitted that such a presumption cannot be found in Anglo-Saxon law, where sometimes the presumption seems to have been the other way. And in a very recent case in the Supreme Court of the United States, the case of Coffin, 156 U. S. 432, it is pointed out that this presumption was fully established in the Roman law, and was preserved in the canon law.»)

Roman Catholic canon law is a fully developed legal system, with all the necessary elements: courts, lawyers, judges, a fully articulated legal code, principles of legal interpretation, and coercive penalties, though it lacks civilly-binding force in most secular jurisdictions.

==== Sharia law ====
Until the 18th century, Sharia law was practiced throughout the Muslim world in a non-codified form, with the Ottoman Empire's Mecelle code in the 19th century being a first attempt at codifying elements of Sharia law. Since the mid-1940s, efforts have been made in country after country to bring Sharia law more in line with modern conditions and conceptions. In modern times, the legal systems of many Muslim countries draw upon both civil and common law traditions as well as Islamic law and custom. The constitutions of certain Muslim states, such as Egypt and Afghanistan, recognise Islam as the state religion and obligate the legislature to adhere to Sharia. Saudi Arabia recognises the Quran as its constitution, and is governed based on Islamic law. Iran has also witnessed a reiteration of Islamic law into its legal system after 1979. During the last few decades, one of the fundamental features of the movement of Islamic resurgence has been the call to restore the Sharia, which has generated a vast amount of literature and affected world politics.

=== Socialist law ===
Socialist law is the legal system in communist states such as the former Soviet Union and the People's Republic of China. Academic opinion is divided on whether it is a separate system from civil law, given major deviations from civil law based on Marxist–Leninist ideology, such as subordinating the judiciary to the executive ruling party.

== Legal methods ==
There are distinguished methods of legal reasoning (applying the law) and methods of interpreting (construing) the law. The former are legal syllogism, which holds sway in civil law legal systems, analogy, which is present in common law legal systems, especially in the US, and argumentative theories that occur in both systems. The latter are different rules (directives) of legal interpretation, such as linguistic, teleological, and systemic interpretation, as well as more specific rules, for instance, the Golden Rule or the mischief rule. There are also many other arguments and cannons of interpretation which altogether make statutory interpretation possible.

Law professor and former United States Attorney General Edward H. Levi noted that the "basic pattern of legal reasoning is reasoning by example"—that is, reasoning by comparing outcomes in cases resolving similar legal questions. In a U.S. Supreme Court case regarding procedural efforts taken by a debt collection company to avoid errors, Justice Sotomayor cautioned that "legal reasoning is not a mechanical or strictly linear process". Laws can in some cases create unintended consequences, perverse incentives or counterproductive effects.

Jurimetrics is the formal application of quantitative methods, especially probability and statistics, to legal questions. The use of statistical methods in court cases and law review articles has grown massively in importance in the last few decades.

== Legal institutions ==
It is a real unity of them all in one and the same person, made by covenant of every man with every man, in such manner as if every man should say to every man: I authorise and give up my right of governing myself to this man, or to this assembly of men, on this condition; that thou givest up, thy right to him, and authorise all his actions in like manner.

— Thomas Hobbes, Leviathan, XVII

The main institutions of law in industrialised countries are independent courts, representative parliaments, an accountable executive, the military and police, bureaucratic organisation, the legal profession and civil society itself. John Locke, in his Two Treatises of Government, and Baron de Montesquieu in The Spirit of the Laws, advocated for a separation of powers between the political, legislative, and executive bodies. Their principle was that no person should be able to usurp all powers of the state, in contrast to the absolutist theory of Thomas Hobbes' Leviathan. Sun Yat-sen's Five Power Constitution for the Republic of China took the separation of powers further by having two additional branches of government—a Control Yuan for auditing oversight and an Examination Yuan to manage the employment of public officials.

Max Weber and others reshaped thinking on the extension of the state. Modern military, policing, and bureaucratic power over ordinary citizens' daily lives pose special problems for accountability that earlier writers such as Locke or Montesquieu could not have foreseen. The customs and practices of the legal profession are an important part of people's access to justice, whilst civil society refers to the social institutions, communities, and partnerships that form the political basis of law.

=== Judiciary ===
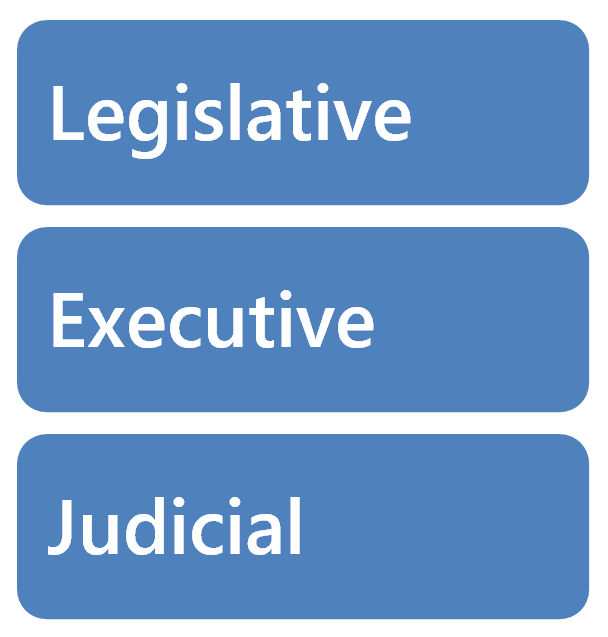
The separation of powers: legislature, executive and judiciary.

The judiciary is the system of courts that applies the law and contracts. Under the doctrine of the separation of powers, the judiciary generally does not make statutory law (which is the responsibility of the legislature) or enforce law (which is the responsibility of the executive), but rather interprets, defends, and applies the law to the facts of each case. However, in some countries the judiciary does make common law.

In many jurisdictions the judicial branch has the power of judicial interpretation, judicial review and constitutional review. Courts with judicial review power may annul the laws and rules of the state when it finds them incompatible with other laws, such as primary legislation, constitution, treaties or international law.

The judiciary can also be thought of as a nonviolent mechanism for conflict resolution. Political bias, sentencing disparties, and higher leniency than the public reduce the political legitimacy of the judiciary. Public confidence in the judiciary varies by country according to opinion polls.

=== Legislature ===
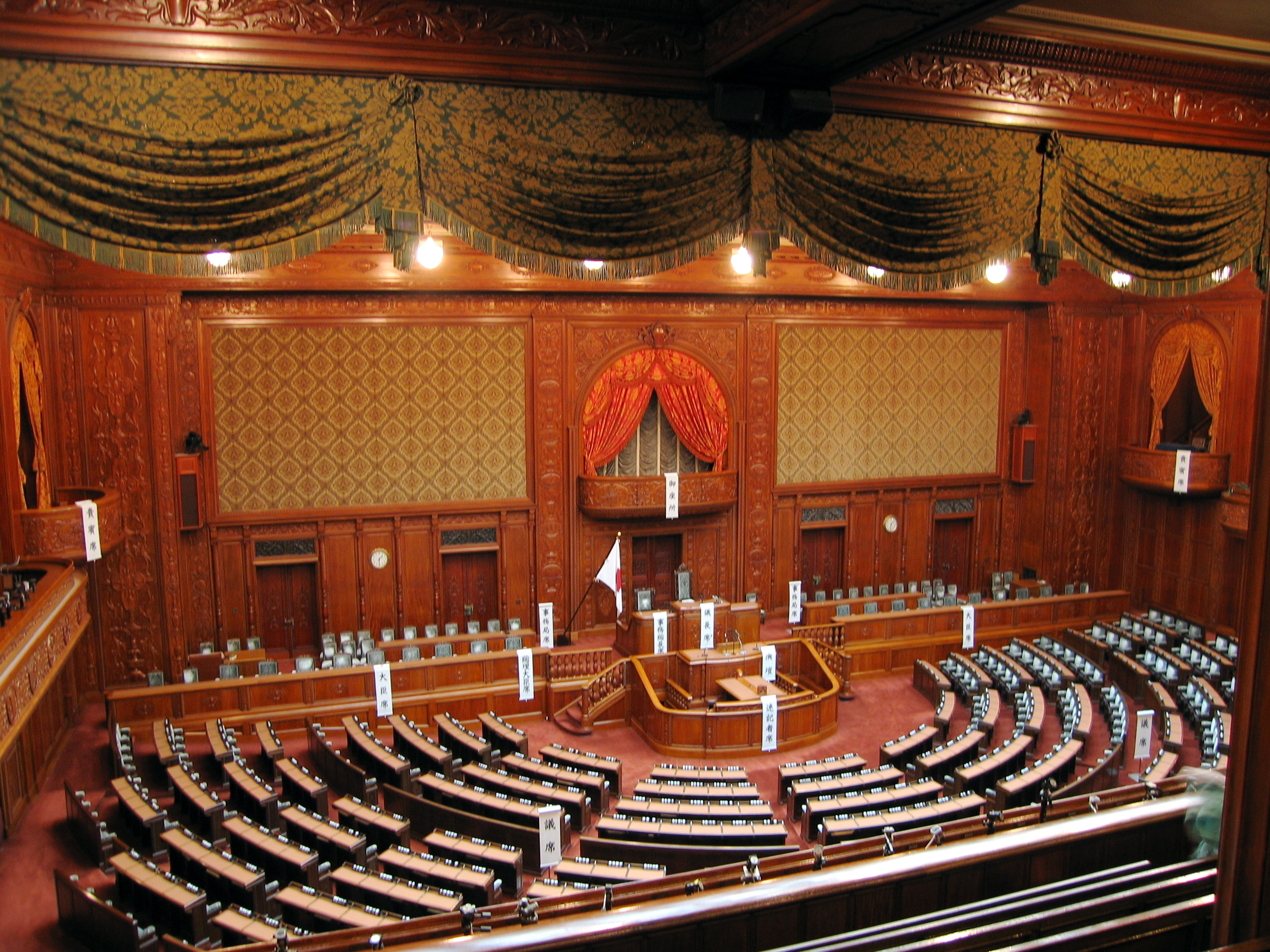
The Chamber of the House of Representatives, the lower house in the National Diet of Japan

Prominent examples of legislatures are the Houses of Parliament in London, the Congress in Washington, D.C., the Bundestag in Berlin, the Duma in Moscow, the Parlamento Italiano in Rome and the Assemblée nationale in Paris. By the principle of representative government, people vote for politicians to carry out their wishes. Although countries like Israel, Greece, Sweden, and China are unicameral, most countries are bicameral, meaning they have two separately appointed legislative houses.

In the 'lower house', politicians are elected to represent smaller constituencies. The 'upper house' is usually elected to represent states in a federal system (as in Australia, Germany, or the United States) or a different voting configuration in a unitary system (as in France). In the UK, the upper house is appointed by the government as a house of review. One criticism of bicameral systems with two elected chambers is that the upper and lower houses may mirror one another. The traditional justification of bicameralism is that an upper chamber acts as a house of review. This can minimise arbitrariness and injustice in governmental action.

To pass legislation, a majority of the members of a legislature must vote for a bill (proposed law) in each house. Normally, there will be several readings and amendments proposed by the different political factions. If a country has an entrenched constitution, a special majority may be required for constitutional changes, making changes to the law more difficult. A government usually leads the process and is formed from Members of Parliament (e.g., in the UK or Germany). However, in a presidential system, the government is usually formed by the executive and their appointed cabinet officials (e.g., the United States or Brazil). (Note: About "cabinet accountability" in both presidential and parliamentary systems, see Shugart–Haggard, Presidential Systems, 67, etc.)

=== Executive ===
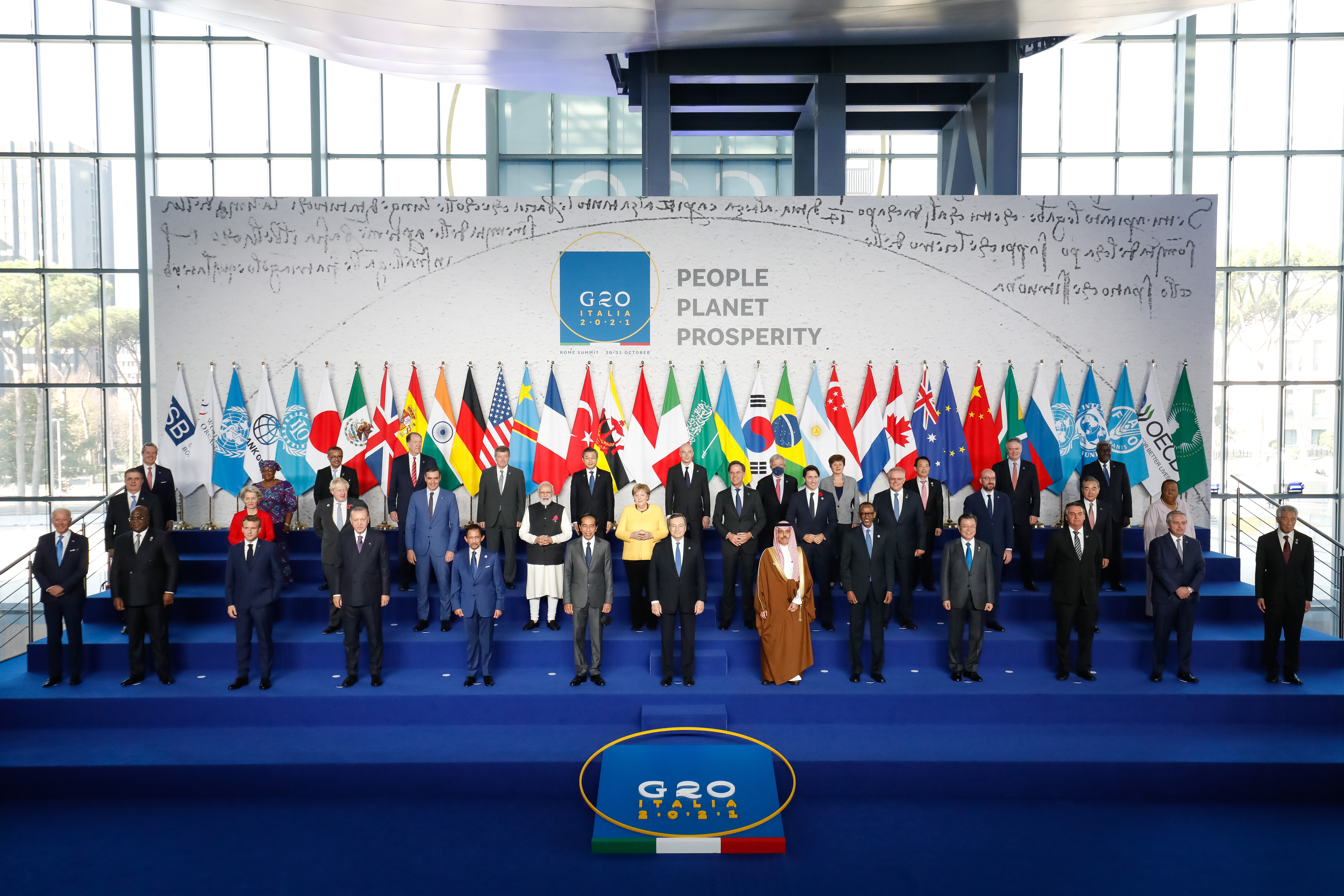
The G20 meetings are composed of representatives of each country's executive branch.

The executive in a legal system serves as the centre of political authority of the State. In a parliamentary system, as with Britain, Italy, Germany, India, and Japan, the executive is known as the cabinet, and is composed of members of the legislature. The executive is led by the head of government, whose office holds power under the confidence of the legislature. Because popular elections appoint political parties to govern, a party's leader can change between elections.

The head of state is separate from the executive, symbolically enacts laws, and serves as the nation's representative. Examples include the President of Germany (appointed by members of federal and state legislatures), the Monarch of the United Kingdom (an hereditary office), and the President of Austria (elected by popular vote). The other important model is the presidential system, found in the United States and in Brazil. In presidential systems, the executive acts as both head of state and head of government, and has the power to appoint an unelected cabinet. Under a presidential system, the executive branch is separate from the legislature to which it is not accountable.

Although the role of the executive varies from country to country, it usually proposes most legislation and sets the government's agenda. In presidential systems, the executive often has the power to veto legislation. Most executives in both systems are responsible for foreign relations, the law enforcement, and the bureaucracy. Ministers or other officials head a country's public offices, such as a foreign ministry or defence ministry. The election of a different executive is therefore capable of revolutionising an entire country's approach to government.

=== Law enforcement ===
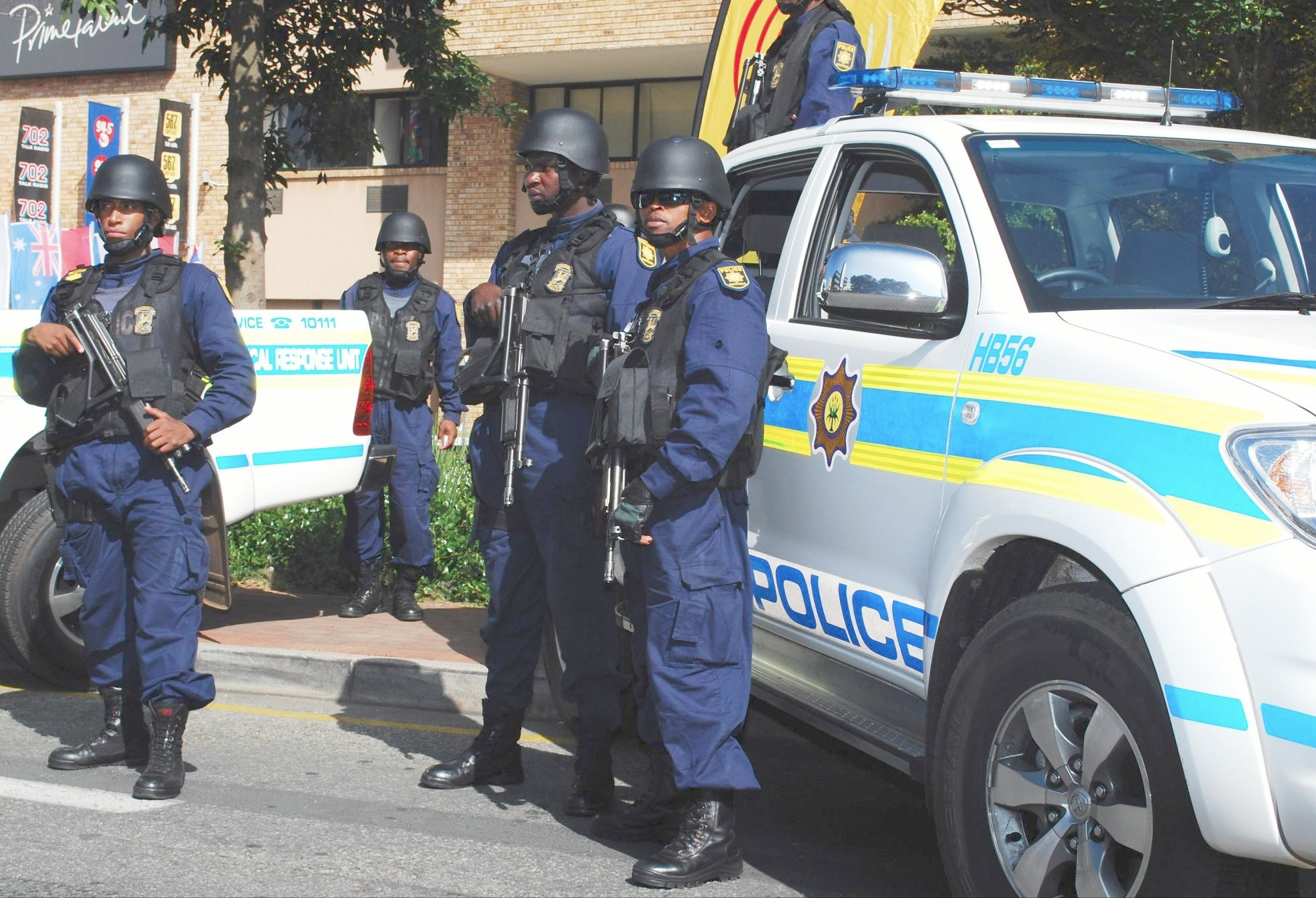
Officers of the South African Police Service in Johannesburg, 2010

Max Weber famously argued that the state is that which controls the monopoly on the legitimate use of force. The military and police carry out law enforcement at the request of the government or the courts. The term failed state refers to states that cannot implement or enforce policies; their police and military no longer control security and order, and society moves into anarchy, the absence of government. (Note: In these cases, sovereignty is eroded, and often warlords acquire excessive powers (Fukuyama, State-Building, 166–167).) While military organisations have existed as long as government itself, the idea of a standing police force is a relatively modern concept. For example, Medieval England's system of travelling criminal courts, or assizes, used show trials and public executions to instill fear in communities and maintain control. The first modern police were probably those in 17th-century Paris, in the court of Louis XIV, although the Paris Prefecture of Police claim they were the world's first uniformed policemen.

=== Bureaucracy ===
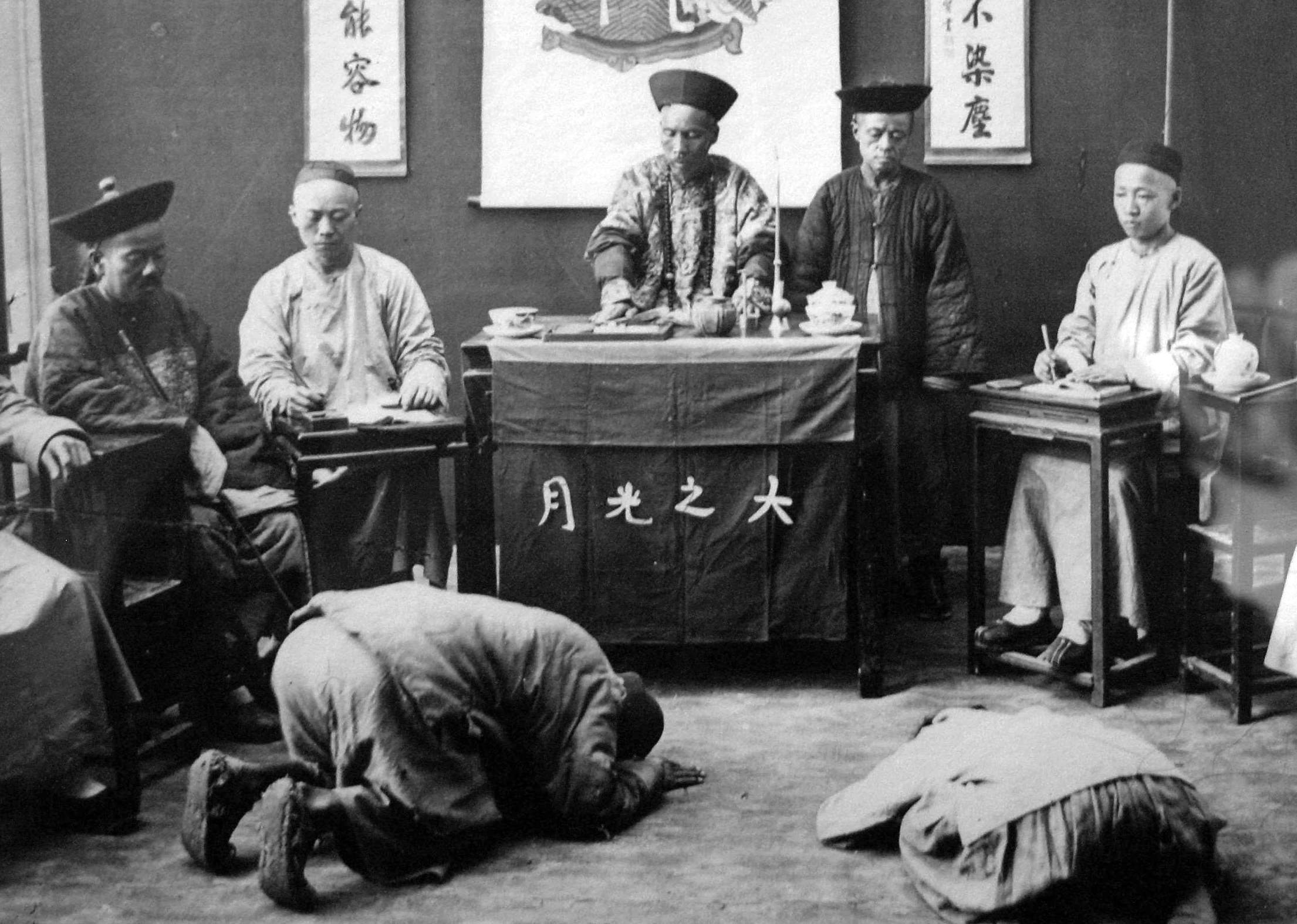
The mandarins were powerful bureaucrats in imperial China (photograph shows a Qing dynasty official with mandarin square visible).

The etymology of bureaucracy derives from the French word for office (bureau) and the Ancient Greek for word power (kratos). Like the military and police, a legal system's government servants and bodies that make up its bureaucracy carry out the directives of the executive. One of the earliest references to the concept was made by Baron de Grimm, a German author who lived in France. In 1765, he wrote:

The real spirit of the laws in France is that bureaucracy of which the late Monsieur de Gournay used to complain so greatly; here the offices, clerks, secretaries, inspectors, and intendants are not appointed to benefit the public interest, indeed the public interest appears to have been established so that offices might exist.

Cynicism over "officialdom" is still common, and the workings of public servants are typically contrasted to private enterprise motivated by profit. In fact, private companies, especially large ones, also have bureaucracies. Negative perceptions of "red tape" aside, public services such as schooling, health care, policing, and public transport are considered crucial state functions, making public bureaucratic action the locus of government power.

Writing in the early 20th century, Max Weber believed that a definitive feature of a developed state had become its bureaucratic support. Weber wrote that the typical characteristics of modern bureaucracy are that officials define its mission, the scope of work is bound by rules; management is composed of career experts who manage top down, communicating through writing and binding public servants' discretion with rules.

=== Legal profession ===
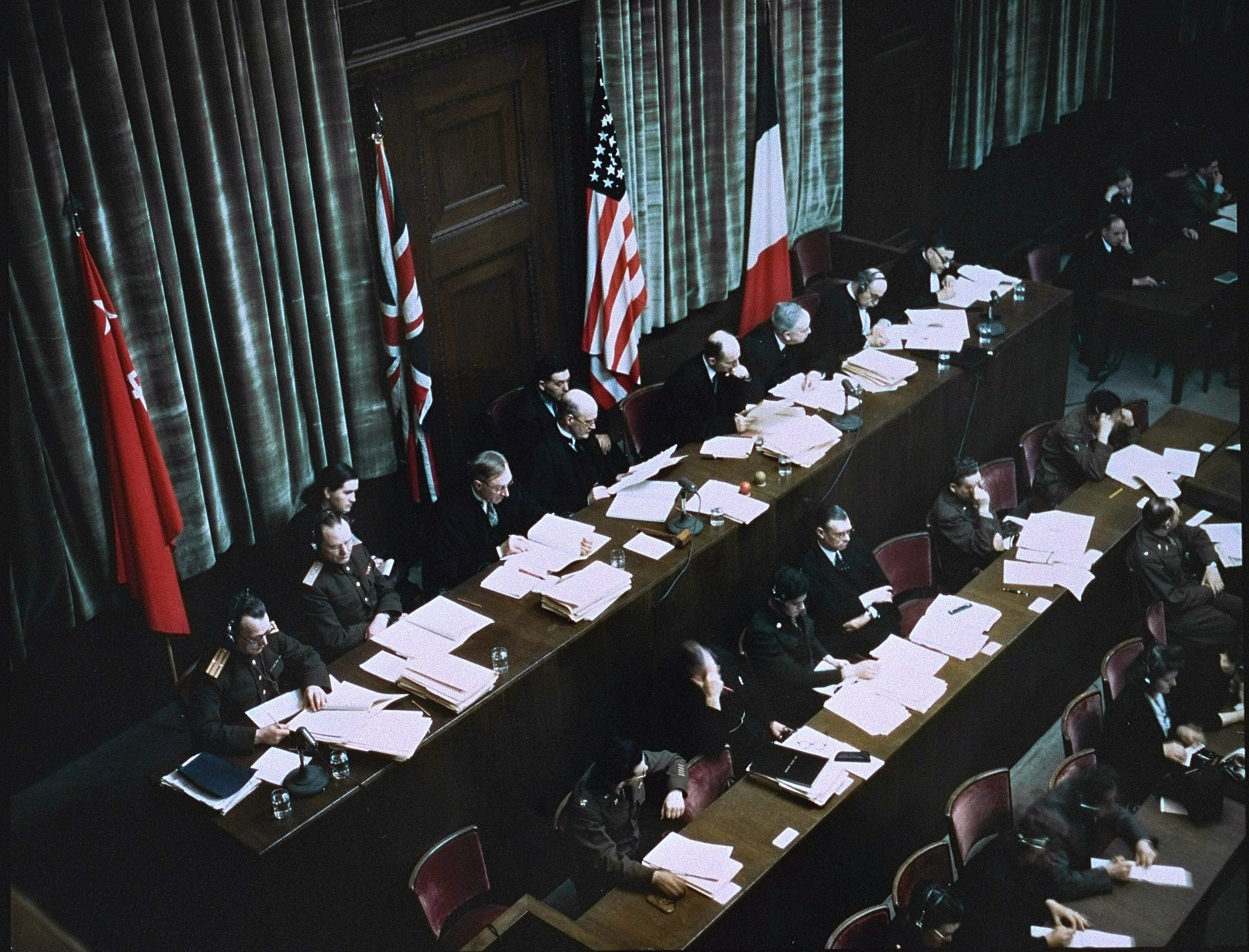
Judges presiding over the Nuremberg trials at the Palace of Justice in Nuremberg, Allied-occupied Germany, 1946

A corollary of the rule of law is the existence of a legal profession sufficiently autonomous to invoke the authority of the independent judiciary; the right to assistance of a barrister in a court proceeding emanates from this corollary—in England, the function of barrister or advocate is distinguished from legal counselor. As the European Court of Human Rights has stated, the law should be adequately accessible to everyone and people should be able to foresee how the law affects them.

To maintain professionalism, the practice of law is typically overseen by a government or an independent regulatory body, such as a bar association, bar council, or law society. Modern lawyers achieve a distinct professional identity through specified legal procedures (e.g., successfully passing a qualifying examination). They are required by law to have a special qualification (a legal education that earns the student a Bachelor of Laws, a Bachelor of Civil Law, or a Juris Doctor degree). Higher academic degrees may also be pursued. Examples include a Master of Laws, a Master of Legal Studies, a Bar Professional Training Course, or a Doctor of Laws. They are constituted in office by legal forms of appointment (being admitted to the bar). There are few titles of respect to signify famous lawyers, such as Esquire, to indicate barristers of greater dignity, and Doctor of law, to indicate a person who obtained a PhD in Law.

Many Muslim countries have developed similar rules governing legal education and the legal profession, but some still allow lawyers trained in traditional Islamic law to practice before personal status courts. In China and other developing countries, there are not sufficient professionally trained people to staff the existing judicial systems, and, accordingly, formal standards are more relaxed.

Once accredited, a lawyer will often work in a law firm, in a chambers as a sole practitioner, in a government post, or in a private corporation as an internal counsel. In addition, a lawyer may become a legal researcher who provides on-demand legal research through a library, a commercial service, or freelance work. Many people trained in law put their skills to use entirely outside the legal field.

Significant to the practice of law in the common law tradition is the legal research to determine the current state of the law. This usually entails exploring case-law reports, legal periodicals and legislation. Law practice also involves drafting documents such as court pleadings, persuasive briefs, contracts, or wills and trusts. Negotiation and dispute resolution skills (including ADR techniques) are also important to legal practice, depending on the field.

=== Civil society ===
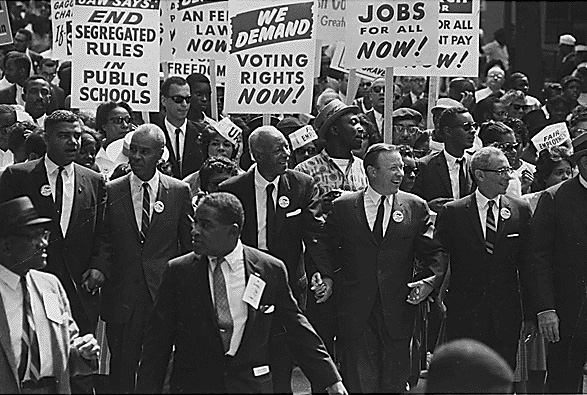
A march in Washington, D.C. during the American civil rights movement in 1963

The Classical republican concept of "civil society" dates back to Hobbes and Locke. Locke saw civil society as people who have "a common established law and judicature to appeal to, with authority to decide controversies between them." German philosopher Georg Wilhelm Friedrich Hegel distinguished the "state" from "civil society" (German: bürgerliche Gesellschaft) in Elements of the Philosophy of Right.

Hegel believed that civil society and the state were opposites, within the scheme of his dialectic theory of history. The modern dipole state–civil society was reproduced in the theories of Alexis de Tocqueville and Karl Marx. In post-modern theory, civil society is necessarily a source of law, by being the basis from which people form opinions and lobby for what they believe law should be. As Australian barrister and author Geoffrey Robertson QC wrote of international law, "one of its primary modern sources is found in the responses of ordinary men and women, and of the non-governmental organizations which many of them support, to the human rights abuses they see on the television screen in their living rooms."

Freedom of speech, freedom of association and many other individual rights allow people to gather, discuss, criticise and hold to account their governments, from which the basis of a deliberative democracy is formed. The more people are involved with, concerned by, and capable of changing how political power is exercised over their lives, the more acceptable and legitimate the law becomes to the people. The most familiar institutions of civil society include economic markets, profit-oriented firms, families, trade unions, hospitals, universities, schools, charities, debating clubs, non-governmental organisations, neighbourhoods, churches, and religious associations. There is no clear legal definition of civil society, and of the institutions it includes. Most institutions and bodies that compile lists of institutions (such as the European Economic and Social Committee) exclude political parties.

== Areas of law ==
All legal systems deal with the same basic issues, but jurisdictions categorise and identify their legal topics in different ways. A common distinction is that between "public law" (a term related closely to the state, and including constitutional, administrative and criminal law), and "private law" (which covers contract, tort and property). (Note: Although many scholars argue that "the boundaries between public and private law are becoming blurred", and that this distinction has become mere "folklore" (Bergkamp, Liability and Environment, 1–2).) In civil law systems, contract and tort fall under a general law of obligations, while trust law is dealt with under statutory regimes or international conventions. Although there is some variation across jurisdictions, legal subjects commonly considered core include international law, constitutional law, administrative law, criminal law, contract, tort, property law, equity and trusts, corporate law and evidence.

=== International law ===
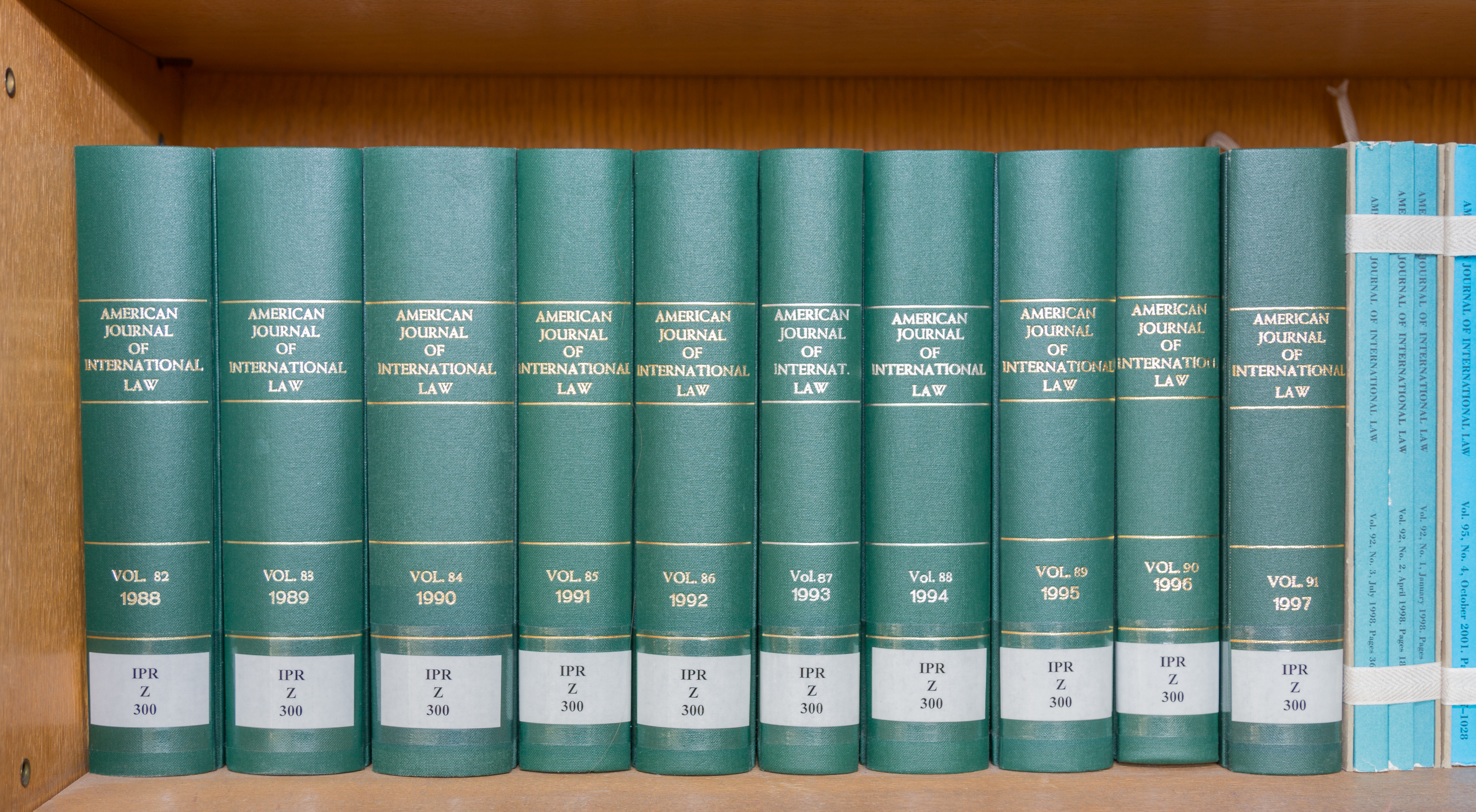
Bound volumes of the American Journal of International Law at the University of Münster in Germany

International law, also known as public international law and the law of nations, is the set of rules, norms, legal customs and standards that states and other actors feel an obligation to, and generally do, obey in their mutual relations. In international relations, actors are simply the individuals and collective entities, such as states, international organizations, and non-state groups, which can make behavioral choices, whether lawful or unlawful. Rules are formal, typically written expectations that outline required behavior, while norms are informal, often unwritten guidelines about appropriate behavior that are shaped by custom and social practice. It establishes norms for states across a broad range of domains, including war and diplomacy, economic relations, and human rights. The term refers to the law that governs not only the conduct of and relations between states, but of international organizations and their relations with states as well.

=== Constitutional and administrative law ===
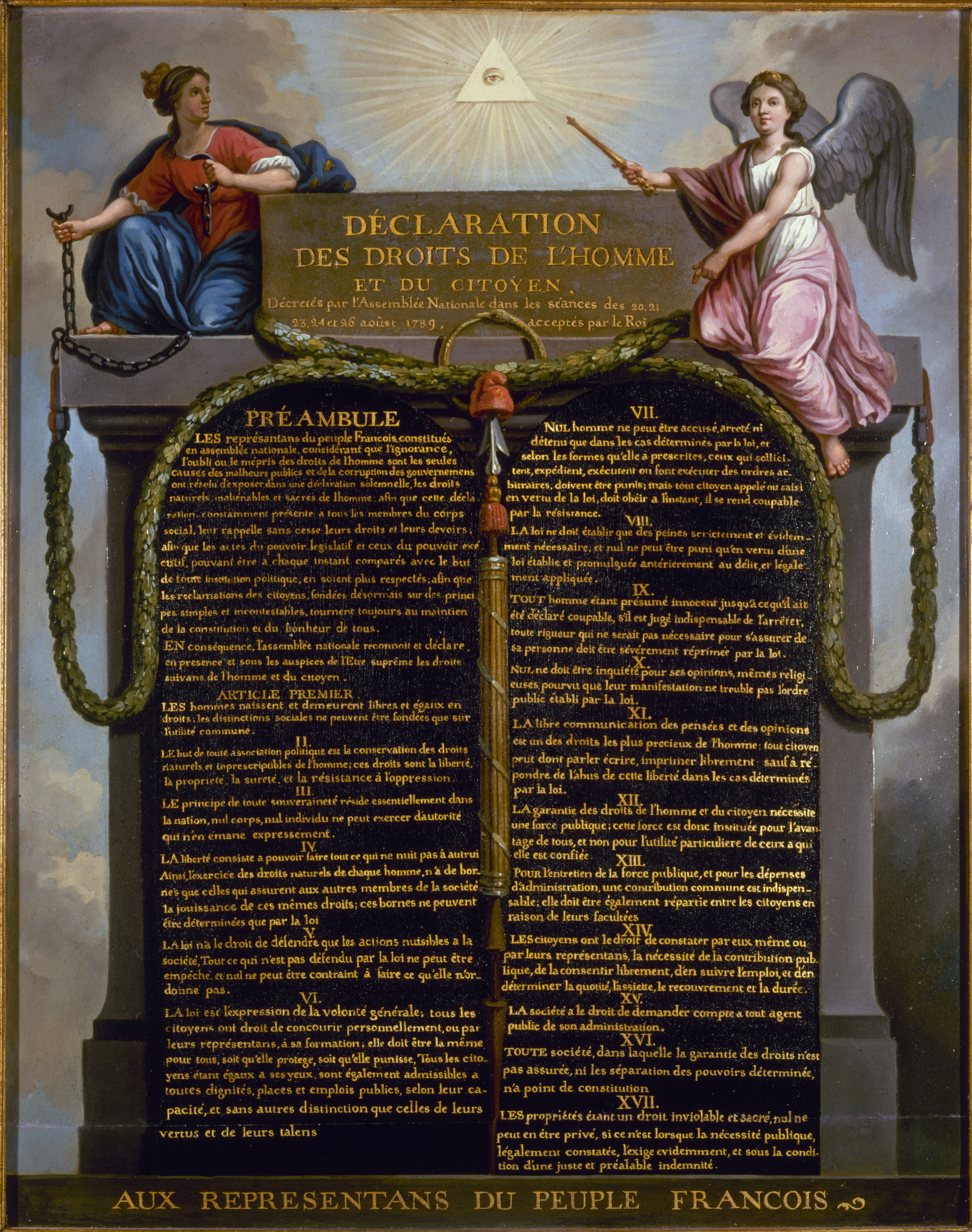
The 1789 French Declaration of the Rights of Man and of the Citizen

Constitutional and administrative law govern the affairs of the state. Constitutional law concerns both the relationships between the executive, legislature, and judiciary and the human rights or civil liberties of individuals against the state. Most jurisdictions, like the United States and France, have a single codified constitution with a bill of rights. A few, like the United Kingdom, have no such document. A "constitution" is simply those laws which constitute the body politic, from statute, case law, and convention.

The fundamental constitutional principle, inspired by John Locke, holds that the individual can do anything except that which is forbidden by law; the state may do nothing except that which is authorised by law. Administrative law is the chief method for people to hold state bodies to account. People (wheresoever allowed) may potentially have the prerogative to legally challenge (or sue) an agency, local council, public service, or government ministry for judicial review of the offending edict (law, ordinance, policy order). Such a challenge tests the government entity's ability to exercise actionable authority under the law and whether it observed the required procedure. The first specialist administrative court was the Conseil d'État set up in 1799, as Napoleon assumed power in France.

A sub-discipline of constitutional law is election law. It, along with Elections commissions, councils, or committees, deals with policies and procedures that facilitate elections. These rules settle disputes or enable the translation of the will of the people into functioning democracies. Election law addresses issues who is entitled to vote, voter registration, ballot access, campaign finance and party funding, redistricting, apportionment, electronic voting and voting machines, accessibility of elections, election systems and formulas, vote counting, election disputes, referendums, and issues such as electoral fraud and electoral silence.

=== Criminal law ===
Criminal law, also known as penal law, pertains to crimes and punishment. It thus regulates the definition of and penalties for offences found to have a sufficiently deleterious social impact, but, in itself, makes no moral judgment on an offender nor imposes restrictions on society that physically prevent people from committing a crime in the first place. Investigating, apprehending, charging, and trying suspected offenders is regulated by the law of criminal procedure. The paradigm case of a crime lies in the proof, beyond reasonable doubt, that a person is guilty of two things. First, the accused must commit an act which is deemed by society to be criminal, or actus reus (guilty act). Second, the accused must have the requisite malicious intent to do a criminal act, or mens rea (guilty mind). However, for so called "strict liability" crimes, an actus reus is enough. Criminal systems of the civil law tradition distinguish between intention in the broad sense (dolus directus and dolus eventualis), and negligence. Negligence does not carry criminal responsibility unless a particular crime provides for its punishment.

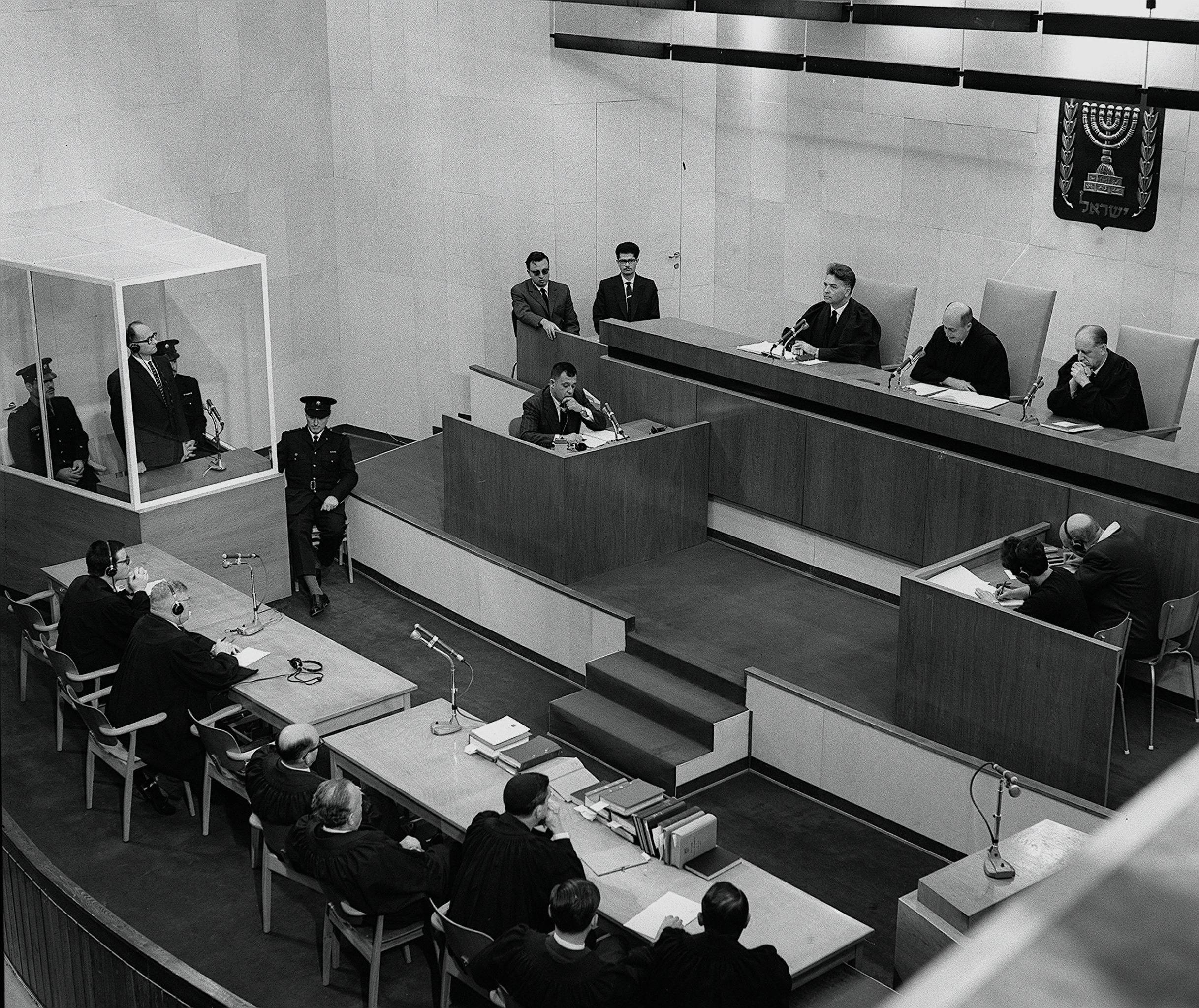
Adolf Eichmann (standing in glass booth at left) being sentenced to death at the conclusion of his 1961 trial, an example of a criminal law proceeding

Examples of crimes include murder, assault, fraud, and theft. In exceptional circumstances defences, can apply to specific acts, such as killing in self defence or pleading insanity. Another example is in the 19th-century English case of R v Dudley and Stephens, which tested whether a defence of "necessity" could justify murder and cannibalism to survive a shipwreck.

Criminal law offences are viewed as offences against not just individual victims but also the community. The state, usually with the help of police, takes the lead in prosecution, which is why in common law countries cases are cited as "The People v ..." or "R (for Rex or Regina) v ...". Also, lay juries are often used to determine defendants' guilt on points of fact; juries cannot change legal rules. Some developed countries still condone capital punishment for certain crimes. Still, the usual punishments for a crime are imprisonment, fines, state supervision (such as probation), or community service. Modern criminal law has been affected considerably by the social sciences, especially with respect to sentencing, legal research, legislation, and rehabilitation. On the international field, 125 countries are members of the International Criminal Court, which was established to try people for crimes against humanity.

=== Contract law ===
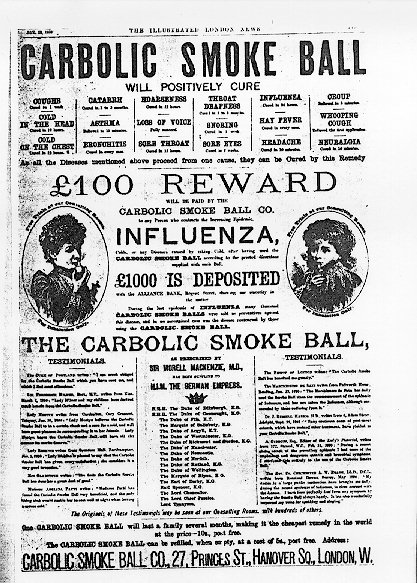
The famous Carbolic Smoke Ball advertisement to cure influenza was held to be a unilateral contract.

Contract law concerns enforceable promises, and can be summed up in the Latin phrase pacta sunt servanda (agreements must be kept). In common law jurisdictions, three key elements to the creation of a contract are necessary: offer and acceptance, consideration, and the intention to create legal relations.

Consideration indicates the fact that all parties to a contract have exchanged something of value. Some common law systems, including Australia, are moving away from the requirement of consideration. The idea of estoppel or culpa in contrahendo can be used to create obligations during pre-contractual negotiations.

Civil law jurisdictions treat contracts differently in several respects, with a more interventionist role for the state in both their formation and enforcement. Compared to common law jurisdictions, civil law systems incorporate more mandatory terms into contracts, allow greater latitude for courts to interpret and revise contract terms and impose a stronger duty of good faith, but are also more likely to enforce penalty clauses and specific performance of contracts. They also do not require consideration for a contract to be binding. In France, an ordinary contract is said to form based on a "meeting of the minds" or a "concurrence of wills". Germany has a distinct approach to contracts that is closely tied to property law. Their 'abstraction principle' (Abstraktionsprinzip) means that the personal obligation of contract forms separately from the title of property being conferred. When contracts are invalidated for some reason (e.g., a car buyer is so drunk that he lacks legal capacity to contract) the contractual obligation to pay can be invalidated separately from the proprietary title of the car. Unjust enrichment law, rather than contract law, is then used to restore title to the rightful owner.

=== Torts and delicts ===
Certain civil wrongs are grouped together as torts under common law systems and delicts under civil law systems. To have acted tortiously, one must have breached a duty to another person, or infringed some pre-existing legal right. A simple example might be unintentionally hitting someone with a ball. Under the law of negligence, the most common form of tort, the injured party could potentially claim compensation for their injuries from the party responsible. The principles of negligence are illustrated by Donoghue v Stevenson. (Note: Donoghue v Stevenson ([1932] A.C. 532, 1932 S.C. (H.L.) 31, [1932] All ER Rep 1). See the original text of the case in UK Law Online Archived 16 February 2007 at the Wayback Machine.) A friend of Donoghue ordered an opaque bottle of ginger beer (intended for the consumption of Donoghue) in a café in Paisley. Having consumed half of it, Donoghue poured the remainder into a tumbler. The decomposing remains of a snail floated out. She claimed to have suffered from shock, fallen ill with gastroenteritis, and sued the manufacturer for carelessly allowing the drink to be contaminated. The House of Lords decided that the manufacturer was liable for Mrs Donoghue's illness. Lord Atkin took a distinctly moral approach and said:

The liability for negligence [...] is no doubt based upon a general public sentiment of moral wrongdoing for which the offender must pay. [...] The rule that you are to love your neighbour becomes in law, you must not injure your neighbour; and the lawyer's question, Who is my neighbour? receives a restricted reply. You must take reasonable care to avoid acts or omissions which you can reasonably foresee would be likely to injure your neighbour.

This became the basis for the four principles of negligence, namely that:

1. Stevenson owed Donoghue a duty of care to provide safe drinks;
2. he breached his duty of care;
3. the harm would not have occurred but for his breach; and
4. his act was the proximate cause of her harm.

Another example of tort might be a neighbour making excessively loud noises with machinery on his property. Under a nuisance claim, the noise could be stopped. Torts can also involve intentional acts such as assault, battery or trespass. A better-known tort is defamation, which occurs, for example, when a newspaper makes unsupportable allegations that damage a politician's reputation. More infamous are economic torts, which form the basis of labour law in some countries by making trade unions liable for strikes, when statute does not provide immunity. (Note: In the UK, Trade Union and Labour Relations (Consolidation) Act 1992; cf. in the U.S., National Labor Relations Act)

=== Property law ===
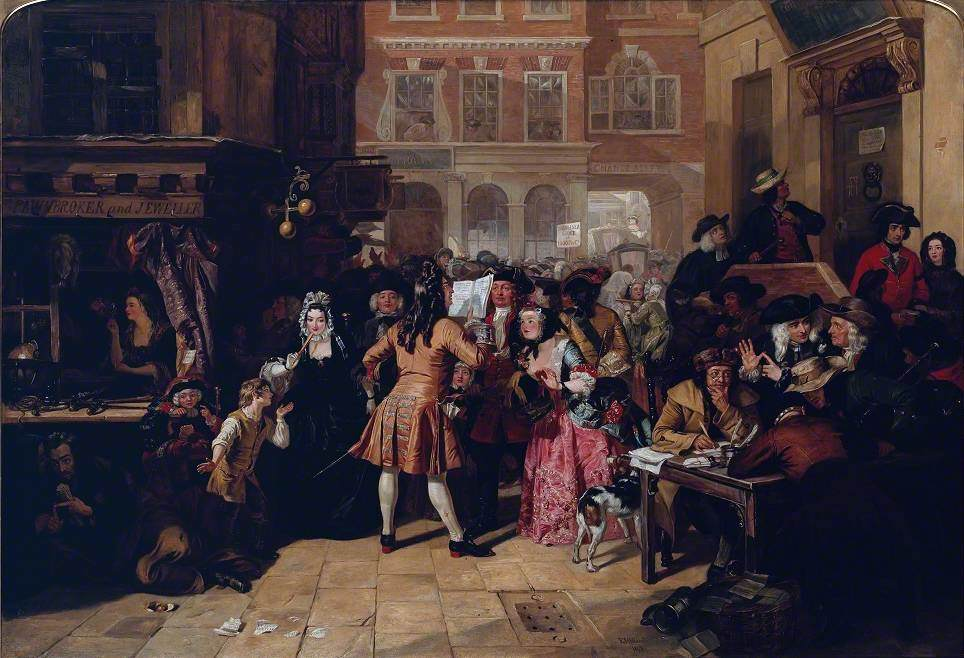
The South Sea Bubble by Edward Matthew Ward. The South Sea Bubble in 1720, one of the world's first-ever speculative bubbles and crashes, led to the strict regulation of share trading.

Property law governs ownership and possession. Real property, sometimes called 'real estate', refers to ownership of land and things attached to it. Personal property, refers to everything else; movable objects, such as computers, cars, jewelry or intangible rights, such as stocks and shares. A right in rem is a right to a specific piece of property, in contrast to a right in personam, which allows compensation for a loss but not for a particular thing. Land law forms the basis for most kinds of property law and is the most complex. It concerns mortgages, rental agreements, licences, covenants, easements and the statutory systems for land registration. Regulations on the use of personal property fall under intellectual property, company law, trusts, and commercial law.

A representative example of property law is the 1722 case of Armory v Delamirie, which applied English law. A child was deprived of possession of the gemstones that had been set in a piece of jewellery, by the businessperson entrusted to appraise the piece. The court held that, under the common law view of property, the person who can show the best claim to a piece of property, against any contesting party, is the owner. By contrast, the classic civil law approach to property, propounded by Friedrich Carl von Savigny, is that it is a right good against the world. Obligations, such as those arising from contracts and torts, are conceptualised as rights owed by individuals. The idea of property raises many further philosophical and political issues. Locke argued that our "lives, liberties and estates" are our property because we own our bodies and mix our labour with our surroundings.

=== Equity and trusts ===
In historical English law, the common law did not permit dividing the ownership from the control of one piece of property—but the law of equity did recognize this through an arrangement known as a trust. Trustees control property, whereas the beneficial, or equitable, ownership of trust property is held by people known as beneficiaries. Trustees owe their beneficiaries a duty to take good care of the property entrusted to them. Another example of a trustee's duty might be to invest property wisely or sell it. This is especially the case for pension funds, the most important form of trust, where investors are trustees for people's savings until retirement. But trusts can also be set up for charitable purposes.

Some international norms for the structure and regulation of trusts are set out in the Hague Trust Convention of 1985.

=== Corporate law ===
Corporate law (also known as company law or enterprise law) is the body of law governing the formation, governance, operation, and dissolution of incorporated entities. It regulates the rights and duties of shareholders, directors, officers, and other stakeholders.

=== The law of evidence ===
The law of evidence encompasses the rules and legal principles governing the proof of facts in legal proceedings. These rules determine what evidence may or may not be considered by a legal decision-maker such as a judge or jury.

== Intersection with other fields ==
=== Economics ===
In the 18th century, Adam Smith presented a philosophical foundation for explaining the relationship between law and economics. (Note: According to Malloy, Smith established "a classical liberal philosophy that made individuals the key referential sign while acknowledging that we live not alone but in community with others".(Law and Economics, 114)) The discipline arose partly out of a critique of trade unions and U.S. antitrust law.

The most prominent economic analyst of law is Ronald Coase, whose first major article, The Nature of the Firm (1937), argued that the reason for the existence of firms (companies, partnerships, etc.) is the existence of transaction costs. Rational individuals trade through bilateral contracts on open markets until the costs of transactions mean that using corporations to produce things is more cost-effective. His second major article, The Problem of Social Cost (1960), argued that if we lived in a world without transaction costs, people would bargain with one another to create the same allocation of resources, regardless of the way a court might rule in property disputes. He contended that law ought to be pre-emptive, and be guided by the most efficient solution.

Many members of the so-called Chicago School are generally advocates of deregulation and privatisation, and are hostile to state regulation or what they see as restrictions on the operation of free markets.

=== Sociology ===
The sociology of law examines the interaction between law and society, overlapping with jurisprudence, philosophy of law, social theory, and more specialised subjects such as criminology. It is a transdisciplinary and multidisciplinary study focused on the theorisation and empirical study of legal practices and experiences as social phenomena. The institutions of social construction, social norms, dispute processing, and legal culture are key areas for inquiry in this knowledge field. In the United States, the field is usually called law and society studies; in Europe, it is more often referred to as socio-legal studies. At first, jurists and legal philosophers were suspicious of the sociology of law. Kelsen attacked one of its founders, Eugen Ehrlich, who sought to clarify the differences and connections between positive law, which lawyers learn and apply, and other forms of 'law' or social norms that regulate everyday life, thereby generally preventing conflicts from reaching lawyers and courts. Contemporary research in the sociology of law is concerned with the way that law develops outside discrete state jurisdictions, being produced through social interaction in social arenas, and acquiring a diversity of sources of authority in national and transnational communal networks.

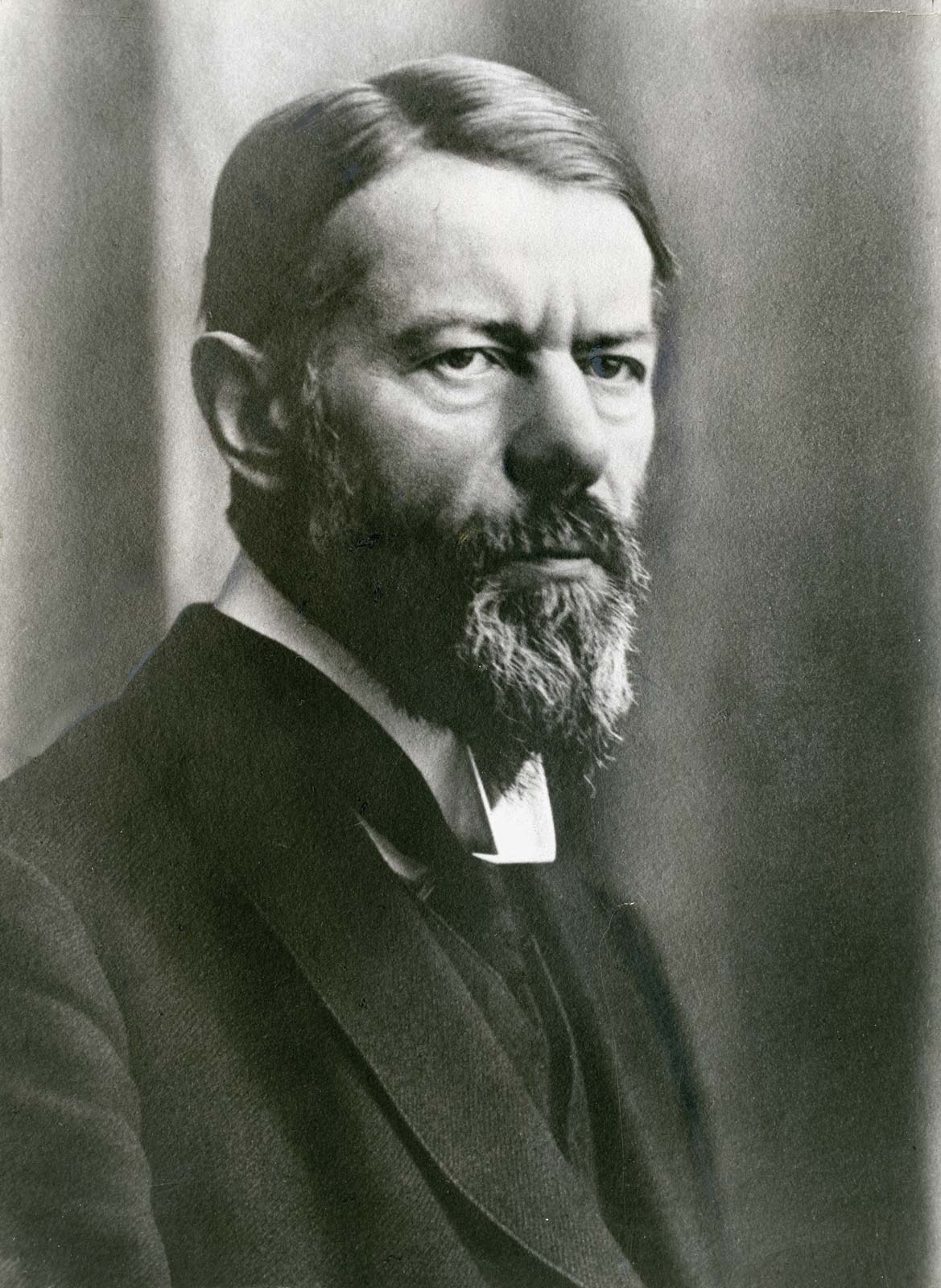
Max Weber, who began his career as a lawyer, and is regarded as one of the founders of sociology and sociology of law

Around 1900, Max Weber defined his "scientific" approach to law, identifying the "legal rational form" as a type of domination, not attributable to personal authority but to the authority of abstract norms. Formal legal rationality was his term for the key characteristic of the coherent and calculable law that was a precondition for modern political developments and the modern bureaucratic state. Weber saw this law as having developed in parallel with the growth of capitalism. Another sociologist, Émile Durkheim, wrote in his classic work The Division of Labour in Society that as society becomes more complex, the body of civil law concerned primarily with restitution and compensation grows at the expense of criminal laws and penal sanctions. Other notable early legal sociologists included Hugo Sinzheimer, Theodor Geiger, Georges Gurvitch and Leon Petrażycki in Europe, and William Graham Sumner in the U.S.

== See also ==
- By-law
- Justice
- Law dictionary
- Lawfare
- Legal industry by country
- Legal research in the United States
- Legal treatise
- Local option
- Outline of law
- Political science
- Pseudolaw
- Public interest law
- Social law
- Sources of law
- Translating "law" to other European languages

== Bibliography ==
- Ahmad, Ahmad Atif (2009). "Lawyers: Islamic Law" ( (PDF)). Oxford Encyclopedia of Legal History. Oxford University Press. Archived from the original on 26 March 2009.
- Akhlaghi, Behrooz (2005). "Iranian Commercial Law and the New Investment Law FIPPA". In Yassari, Nadjma (ed.). The Sharīʻa in the Constitutions of Afghanistan, Iran, and Egypt. Mohr Siebeck. ISBN 978-3-16-148787-3.
- Albrow, Martin (1970). Bureaucracy (Key Concepts in Political Science). London: Palgrave Macmillan. ISBN 978-0-333-11262-5.
- Anderson, J.N.D. (January 1956). "Law Reform in the Middle East". International Affairs. 32 (1): 43–51. doi:10.2307/2607811. JSTOR 2607811.
- Aristotle. Athenian Constitution . Translated by Frederic George Kenyon – via Wikisource. See original text in Perseus Project Archived 8 October 2008 at the Wayback Machine.
- Arnold, Thurman W. (1935). "The Symbols of Government". American Political Science Review. New Haven: Yale University Press: 379.
- Auby, Jean-Bernard (2002). "Administrative Law in France". In Stroink, F.A.M.; Seerden, René (eds.). Administrative Law of the European Union, its Member States and the United States. Intersentia. ISBN 978-90-5095-251-4.
- Barzilai, Gad (2003). Communities and Law: Politics and Cultures of Legal Identities. The University of Michigan Press. ISBN 978-0-472-11315-6.
- Bayles, Michael D. (1992). "A Critique of Austin". Hart's Legal Philosophy. Springer. ISBN 978-0-7923-1981-8.
- Beale, Hugh; Tallon, Denis (2002). "English Law: Consideration". Contract Law. Hart Publishing. ISBN 978-1-84113-237-2.
- Berger, Adolf (1953). Encyclopedic Dictionary of Roman Law. American Philosophical Society. ISBN 978-0-87169-432-4. "Roman ars boni et aequi."
- Bergkamp, Lucas (2001). "Introduction". Liability and Environment. Martinus Nijhoff Publishers. ISBN 978-90-411-1645-1.
- Berle, Adolf (1932). Modern Corporation and Private Property. New York, Chicago, Commerce Clearing House, Loose leaf Service division of the Corporation Trust Co.
- Bix, Brian (2022). "John Austin". Stanford Encyclopedia of Philosophy. Archived from the original on 26 June 2007.
- Blackstone, William (1765–69). Commentaries on the Laws of England. Archived from the original on 5 July 2011.
- Brody, David C.; Acker, James R.; Logan, Wayne A. (2001). "Introduction to the Study of Criminal Law". Criminal Law. Jones & Bartlett Publishers. ISBN 978-0-8342-1083-7.
- Campbell, Tom D. (1993). "The Contribution of Legal Studies". In Robert E. Goodin; Philip Pettit (eds.). A Companion to Contemporary Political Philosophy. Malden, Mass.: Blackwell Publishing. ISBN 978-0-631-19951-9.
- Churchill, Winston (1986). "Problems of War and Peace". The Hinge of Fate. Houghton Mifflin Books. ISBN 978-0-395-41058-5.
- Clarke, Paul A. B.; Linzey, Andrew (1996). Dictionary of Ethics, Theology and Society. London: Routledge. ISBN 978-0-415-06212-1.
- Coase, Ronald H. (November 1937). "The Nature of the Firm". Economica. 4 (16): 386–405. doi:10.1111/j.1468-0335.1937.tb00002.x.
- Coase, Ronald H. (October 1960). "The Problem of Social Cost (this online version excludes some parts)" (PDF). Journal of Law and Economics. 3: 1–44. doi:10.1086/466560. S2CID 222331226. Archived (PDF) from the original on 4 November 2018.
- Cohen, Morris L. (1992). Law : the Art of Justice. Beaux Arts Editions. ISBN 9780883633120.
- Cotterrell, Roger (1992). The Sociology of Law: An Introduction. Oxford University Press. ISBN 978-0-406-51770-8.
- Cotterrell, Roger (1999). Emile Durkheim: Law in a Moral Domain. Edinburgh University Press/ Stanford University Press. ISBN 978-0-7486-1339-7.
- Cotterrell, Roger (2006). Law, Culture and Society: Legal Ideas in the Mirror of Social Theory. Ashgate. ISBN 978-0-7546-2511-7.
- Curtin, Deirdre; Wessel, Ramses A. (2005). "A Survey of the Content of Good Governance for some International Organisations". Good Governance and the European Union: Reflections on Concepts, Institutions and Substance. Intersentia nv. ISBN 978-90-5095-381-8.
- Demirgüç-Kunt, Asli; Levine, Ross (2001). Financial Structures and Economic Growth. MIT Press. ISBN 978-0-262-54179-4.
- Dicey, Albert Venn (2005). "Parliamentary Sovereignty and Federalism". Introduction to the Study of the Law of the Constitution. Adamant Media Corporation. ISBN 978-1-4021-8555-7.
- Dörmann, Knut; Doswald-Beck, Louise; Kolb, Robert (2003). "Appendix". Elements of War Crimes. Cambridge University Press. ISBN 978-0-521-81852-0.
- Durkheim, Émile (1893). The Division of Labor in Society. The Free Press reprint. ISBN 978-0-684-83638-6.
- Dworkin, Ronald (1986). Law's Empire. Harvard University Press. ISBN 978-0-674-51836-0.
- Ehrlich, Eugen (2002) [1936]. Fundamental Principles of the Sociology of Law. Transaction Books reprint.
- Farah, Paolo (August 2006). "Five Years of China WTO Membership. EU and US Perspectives about China's Compliance with Transparency Commitments and the Transitional Review Mechanism". Legal Issues of Economic Integration. 33 (3): 263–304. doi:10.54648/LEIE2006016. S2CID 153128973. SSRN 916768.
- Feinman, Jay M. (2006). "Criminal Responsibility and Criminal Law". Law 101. Oxford University Press US. ISBN 978-0-19-517957-6.
- Findlay, Marc (1999). "'Independence' and the Judiciary in the PRC". In Jayasuriya, Kanishka (ed.). Law, Capitalism and Power in Asia. Routledge. ISBN 978-0-415-19742-7.
- Fine, Tony F. (2001). "The Globalization of Legal Education in the United States". In Drolshammer, Jens I.; Pfeifer, Michael (eds.). The Internationalization of the Practice of Law. Martinus Nijhoff Publishers. ISBN 978-90-411-1620-8.
- Finn, John E. (1991). "Constitutional Dissolution in the Weimar Republic". Constitutions in Crisis: Political Violence and the Rule of Law. Oxford University Press. ISBN 978-0-19-505738-6.
- France, Anatole (1894). The Red Lily (Le lys rouge). Archived from the original on 17 April 2021.
- Fukuyama, Francis (2005). State-Building (First edition in English 2004 ed.). Editions Livanis. ISBN 978-960-14-1159-0.
- Georgiadis, Apostolos S. (1997). "Sources of Law". General Principles of Civil Law (in Greek). Ant. N. Sakkoulas Publishers. ISBN 978-960-232-715-9.
- Giannoulatos, Anastasios (1975). "Characteristics of Modern Islam". Islam – A General Survey (in Greek). Athens: Poreuthentes.
- Glenn, H. Patrick (2000). Legal Traditions of the World. Oxford University Press. ISBN 978-0-19-876575-2.
- Goldhaber, Michael D. (2007). "Europe's Supreme Court". A People's History of the European Court of Human Rights. Rutgers University Press. ISBN 978-0-8135-3983-6.
- Gordley, James R.; von Mehren, Arthur Taylor (2006). An Introduction to the Comparative Study of Private Law. Cambridge: Cambridge University Press. ISBN 978-0-521-68185-8.
- Gurvitch, Georges; Hunt, Alan (2001) [1942]. "Max Weber and Eugen Ehrlich". Sociology of Law. Athens: Transaction Publishers. ISBN 978-0-7658-0704-5.
- Haggard, Stephan; Shugart, Matthew Soberg (2001). "Institutions and Public Policy in Presidential Systems". In Haggard, Stephan; McCubbins, Mathew Daniel (eds.). Presidents, Parliaments and Policy. Cambridge University Press. ISBN 978-0-521-77485-7.
- Hallaq, Wael Bahjat (2005). "Introduction". The Origins and Evolution of Islamic Law. Cambridge University Press. ISBN 978-0-521-00580-7.
- Hamilton, Michael S., and George W. Spiro (2008). The Dynamics of Law, 4th ed. Armonk, NY: M.E. Sharpe, Inc. ISBN 978-0-7656-2086-6.
- Harris, Ron (September 1994). "The Bubble Act: Its Passage and Its Effects on Business Organization". The Journal of Economic History. 54 (3): 610–627. doi:10.1017/S0022050700015059. JSTOR 2123870?. S2CID 154429555.
- Hart, H.L.A. (1961). The Concept of Law. Oxford University Press.
- Hatzis, Aristides N. (November 2002). "The Nature of the Firm". European Journal of Law and Economics. 14 (3): 253–263. doi:10.1023/A:1020749518104. S2CID 142679220.
- Hayek, Friedrich (1978). The Constitution of Liberty. University of Chicago Press. ISBN 978-0-226-32084-7.
- Hazard, Geoffrey C.; Dondi, Angelo (2004). Legal Ethics. Stanford University Press. ISBN 978-0-8047-4882-7.
- Hegel, Georg (1820). Elements of the Philosophy of Right (in German). Archived from the original on 17 April 2021.
- Heinze, Eric (2013). The Concept of Injustice. Routledge. ISBN 978-0-415-52441-4.
- Hertogh, Marc, ed. (2009). Living Law: Reconsidering Eugen Ehrlich. Hart. ISBN 978-1-84113-898-5.
- Hobbes, Thomas (1651). "Chapter XVII: Of the Causes, Generation, and Definition of a Commonwealth". Leviathan. Archived from the original on 27 November 2010.
- Jakobs, Lesley A. (2004). "Retrieving Equality of Opportunity". Pursuing Equal Opportunities. Cambridge University Press. ISBN 978-0-521-53021-7.
- Jakoby, Stanford M. (2005). "Economic Ideas and the Labour Market – Chapter: Cycles of Economic Thought" (PDF). Comparative Labor Law and Policy Journal. 25 (1): 43–78. Archived from the original (PDF) on 14 June 2007.
- Jary, David; Jary, Julia (1995). Collins Dictionary of Sociology. HarperCollins. ISBN 978-0-00-470804-1.
- Jensen, Eric G.; Heller, Thomas C. (2003). "Introduction". In Jensen, Eric G.; Heller, Thomas C. (eds.). Beyond Common Knowledge. Stanford University Press. ISBN 978-0-8047-4803-2.
- Johnson, Alan (1995). The Blackwell Dictionary of Sociology. Blackwells. ISBN 978-1-55786-116-0.
- Kaiser, Dagmar (2005). "Leistungsstōrungen". In Staudinger, Julius von; Martinek, Michael; Beckmann, Roland Michael (eds.). Eckpfeiler Des Zivilrechts. Walter de Gruyter. ISBN 978-3-8059-1019-4.
- Kaldor, Mary; Anheier, Helmut; Glasius, Marlies (2003). "Global Civil Society in an Era of Regressive Globalisation". In Kaldor, Mary; Anheier, Helmut; Glasius, Marlies (eds.). Global Civil Society Yearbook 2003. Oxford University Press. ISBN 978-0-19-926655-5.
- Kant, Immanuel (1998) [1785]. Groundwork of the Metaphysics of Morals (Translated by Mary Gregor). Cambridge University Press. ISBN 978-0-521-62695-8.
- Karkatsoulis, Panagioti (2004). "Civil Society and New Public Management". The State in Transitions (PDF) (in Greek). Athens: I. Sideris. ISBN 978-960-08-0333-4. Archived from the original (PDF) on 17 August 2007.
- Kazantzakis, Nikos (1998) [1909]. "Law". Friedrich Nietzsche and the Philosophy of Law and Polity (in Greek). Athens: Editions Kazantzakis.
- Kelly, J.M. (1992). A Short History of Western Legal Theory. Oxford University Press. ISBN 978-0-19-876244-7.
- Kettl, Don (November 2006). "Public Bureaucracies". In R. A. W. Rhodes; Sarah A. Binder; Bert A. Rockman (eds.). The Oxford Handbook of Political Institutions. Oxford University Press. ISBN 978-0-19-927569-4.
- Linarelli, John (2004). "Nietzsche in Law's Cathedral: Beyond Reason and Postmodernism – Chapter: Cycles of Economic Thought" (PDF). Catholic University Law Review. 53: 413–457. doi:10.2139/ssrn.421040. S2CID 54617575. SSRN 421040. Archived from the original (PDF) on 9 March 2019.
- Locke, John (1689). "Second Treatise of Government" . Two Treatises of Government – via Wikisource.
- Luban, David (2001). "Law's Blindfold". Conflict of Interest in the Professions. Oxford University Press. ISBN 978-0-19-512863-5.
- Mallory, J.P. (1997). "Law". Encyclopedia of Indo-European Culture.
- Malloy, Robin Paul (1994). "Adam Smith and the Modern Discourse of Law and Economics". In Paul Malloy, Robin; Evensky, Jerry (eds.). Adam Smith and the Philosophy of Law and Economics. Springer. ISBN 978-0-7923-2796-7.
- Markovits, I. (December 2007). "The Death of Socialist Law?". Annual Review of Law and Social Science. 3: 233–253. doi:10.1146/annurev.lawsocsci.3.081806.112849.
- Mattei, Ugo (1997). "The Distinction between Common Law and Civil Law". Comparative Law and Economics. University of Michigan Press. ISBN 978-0-472-06649-0.
- Matthews, Paul (1995). "The Man of Property". Medical Law Review. 3 (3): 251–274. doi:10.1093/medlaw/3.3.251. PMID 11657690. S2CID 41659603.
- McGhee, John (2000). Snell's Equity. London: Sweet and Maxwell. ISBN 978-0-421-85260-0.
- Mises, Ludwig von (1962) [1944]. Bureaucracy (PDF). Archived (PDF) from the original on 6 December 2006.
- Montesquieu, Baron de (1748). "Book XI: Of the Laws Which Establish Political Liberty, with Regard to the Constitution, Chapters 6–7". The Spirit of Laws (translated in English by Thomas Nugent, revised by J. V. Prichard). Archived from the original on 18 January 2009.
- Nietzsche, Friedrich (1887). "Zweite Abhandlung: "Schuld", "schlechtes Gewissen" und Verwandtes". Zur Genealogie der Moral – Eine Streitschrift (in German).
- Ober, Josiah (1996). "The Nature of Athenian Democracy". The Athenian Revolution: Essays on Ancient Greek Democracy and Political Theory. Princeton University Press. ISBN 978-0-691-00190-6.
- Olivelle, Patrick (2005). Manu's Code of Law: A Critical Edition and Translation of the Manava-Dharmasastra. New York: Oxford University Press. ISBN 978-0-19-517146-4.
- Olson, David M.; Norton, Philip (1996). "Legislatures in Democratic Transition". The New Parliaments of Central and Eastern Europe. Frank Cass (UK). ISBN 978-0-7146-4261-1.
- Papachristou, T.K. (1999). "The Sociological Approach of Law". Sociology of Law (in Greek). Athens: A.N. Sakkoulas Publishers. ISBN 978-960-15-0106-2.
- Pargendler, Maria (2018). "The Role of the State in Contract Law: The Common-Civil Law Divide" (PDF). Yale Journal of International Law. 43 (1): 143–189. doi:10.2139/ssrn.2848886. S2CID 3548111. Archived (PDF) from the original on 3 January 2020.
- Patterson, James T. (2001). Brown v. Board of Education: A Civil Rights Milestone and Its Troubled Legacy. New York: Oxford University Press. ISBN 978-0-19-515632-4.
- Pelczynski, A.Z. (1984). The State and Civil Society. Cambridge University Press.
- Petersmann, Ernst-Ulrich (1997). "Rule of Law and Constitutionalism". The GATT/WTO Dispute Settlement System. Martinus Nijhoff Publishers. ISBN 978-90-411-0933-0.
- Rasekh, Mohammad (2005). "Are Islamism and Republicanism Compatible?". In Yassari, Nadjma (ed.). The Sharīʻa in the Constitutions of Afghanistan, Iran, and Egypt. Mohr Siebeck. ISBN 978-3-16-148787-3.
- Raz, Joseph (1979). The Authority of Law, Essays on Law and Morality. Oxford University Press. ISBN 978-0-19-825493-5.
- Redfem, Alan (2004). "Regulation of International Arbitration". Law and Practice of International Commercial Arbitration. Sweet & Maxwell. ISBN 978-0-421-86240-1.
- Rheinstein, M. (1954). Max Weber on Law and Economy in Society. Harvard University Press.
- Richardson, W.E.J. (2004). "Introduction". Hammurabi's Laws. Continuum International Publishing Group. ISBN 978-0-567-08158-2.
- Riker, William H. (January 1992). "The Justification of Bicameralism". International Political Science Review. 13 (1): 101–116. doi:10.1177/019251219201300107. JSTOR 1601440. S2CID 154483653.
- Robertson, Geoffrey (2006). Crimes Against Humanity. Penguin. ISBN 978-0-14-102463-9.
- Roeber, A. G. (October 2001). "What the Law Requires Is Written on Their Hearts: Noachic and Natural Law among German-Speakers in Early Modern North America". William and Mary Quarterly. Third Series. 58 (4): 883–912. doi:10.2307/2674504. JSTOR 2674504.
- Rottleuthner, Hubert (December 1989). "La Sociologie du Droit en Allemagne" (PDF). Droit et Société (in French). 11: 101–120. doi:10.3406/dreso.1989.1026. Archived from the original (PDF) on 28 November 2006.
- Rottleuthner, Hubert (1984). "Rechtstheoritische Probleme der Sociologie des Rechts. Die Kontroverse zwischen Hans Kelsen und Eugen Ehrlich (1915/17)". Rechtstheorie (in German). 5: 521–551.
- Rousseau, Jean-Jacques (1762). "Book II: Chapter 6 (Law)". The Social Contract (translated in English by G. D. H. Cole) (in French). Archived from the original on 22 February 2008.
- Salazar, Philippe-Joseph (2019). Air Law. Juta. ISBN 9781485133148.
- Savigny, Friedrich Carl von (1803). "Zu welcher Classe von Rechten gehört der Besitz?". Das Recht des Besitzes (in German). Archived from the original on 6 October 2008.
- Schermers, Henry G.; Blokker, Niels M. (1995). "Supervision and Sanctions". International Institutional Law. The Hague/London/Boston: Martinus Nijhoff Publisher.
- Sealy, L.S.; Hooley, R.J.A. (2003). Commercial Law. LexisNexis Butterworths.
- Sherif, Adel Omar (2005). "Constitutions of Arab Countries and the Position of Sharia". In Yassari, Nadjma (ed.). The Sharīʻa in the Constitutions of Afghanistan, Iran, and Egypt. Mohr Siebeck. ISBN 978-3-16-148787-3.
- Simpson, A.W.B. (1984). Cannibalism and the Common Law. Chicago: University of Chicago Press. ISBN 978-0-226-75942-5.
- Smith, Stephen A. (2003). "The Structure of Unjust Enrichment Law: Is Restitution a Right or a Remedy" (PDF). Loyola of Los Angeles Law Review. 36 (2): 1037–1062. Archived (PDF) from the original on 19 January 2012.
- Stein, Peter (1999). Roman Law in European History. Cambridge University Press. ISBN 978-0-521-64372-6.
- Stone, Julius (1965). "Early Horizons of Justice in the West". Human Law and Human Justice. Stanford University Press. ISBN 978-0-8047-0215-7.
- Tamanaha, Brian Z. (2004). "Locke, Montesquieu the Federalist Papers". On the Rule of Law. Cambridge University Press. ISBN 978-0-521-60465-9.
- Théodoridés, Aristide (1999). "law". Encyclopedia of the Archaeology of Ancient Egypt. Routledge (UK). 0-415-18589-0.
- VerSteeg, Russ (2002). Law in Ancient Egypt. Durham, N.C.: Carolina Academic Press. ISBN 978-0-89089-978-6.
- Warren, Mark E. (1999). Civil Society and Good Governance (PDF). Washington DC: Center for the Study of Voluntary Organisations and Services, Georgetown University. Archived from the original (PDF) on 29 October 2008.
- Washofsky, Mark (2002). "Taking Precedent Seriously". Re-Examining Progressive Halakhah edited by Walter Jacob, Moshe Zemer. Berghahn Books. ISBN 978-1-57181-404-3.
- Weber, Max (1978). "Bureaucracy and Political Leadership". Economy and Society, Volume I (Translated and edited by Claus Wittich, Ephraim Fischoff, and Guenther Roth). University of California Press. ISBN 978-0-520-03500-3.
- Weber, Max (1919). Politics as a Vocation – via Wikisource.
- Weber, Max (1964). The Theory of Social and Economic Organization (Edited with Introduction by Talcott Parsons – Translated in English by A. M. Henderson). The Free Press of Glencoe. ASIN B-000-LRHAX-2.
- Wehberg, Hans (October 1959). "Pacta Sunt Servanda". The American Journal of International Law. 53 (4): 775–786. doi:10.2307/2195750. JSTOR 2195750. S2CID 147466309.
- Wilson, William (2003). "Understanding Criminal Law". Criminal Law. Pearson Education. ISBN 978-0-582-47301-0.
- Willis, Hugh Evander (January 1926). "A Definition of Law". Virginia Law Review. 12 (3): 203–214. doi:10.2307/1065717. JSTOR 1065717. Archived from the original on 12 February 2020.
- World Intellectual Property Organization (1997). "The System of Intellectual Property". Introduction to Intellectual Property. Kluwer Law International. ISBN 978-90-411-0938-5.
- Paolo, Silvestri (11 June 2014). "The ideal of good government in Luigi Einaudi's Thought and Life: Between Law and Freedom". SSRN 2447898. Archived from the original on 25 February 2022.
