= Taking Rights Seriously =

1977 book by Ronald Dworkin

- Cover of the first edition
- Author: Ronald Dworkin
- Language: English
- Subject: Philosophy of law
- Publisher: Harvard University Press
- Publication date: 1977
- Publication place: United States
- Media type: Print (Hardcover and Paperback)
- Pages: xv, 293 p
- ISBN: 0-674-86710-6
- OCLC: 2847963
- LC Class: K240 .D9 1977

Taking Rights Seriously is a 1977 book about the philosophy of law by the philosopher Ronald Dworkin. In the book, Dworkin argues against the dominant philosophy of Anglo-American legal positivism as presented by H. L. A. Hart in The Concept of Law (1961) and utilitarianism by proposing that rights of the individual against the state exist outside of the written law and function as "trumps" against the interests or wishes of the majority.

Most of the book's chapters are revised versions of previously published papers. In addition to his critique of legal positivism and utilitarian ethics, Dworkin includes important discussions of constitutional interpretation, judicial discretion, civil disobedience, reverse discrimination, John Rawls' theory of justice, and the Hart–Devlin debate on legislating morality.

A revised edition of book, which includes a lengthy reply by Dworkin to his critics, was published in 1978.
