= The Concept of Law =

1961 book by H. L. A. Hart

- First edition
- Author: H. L. A. Hart
- Language: English
- Series: Clarendon Law Series
- Genre: Legal philosophy
- Publisher: Oxford University Press
- Publication date: 1961

The Concept of Law is a 1961 book by the legal philosopher H. L. A. Hart and his most famous work. The Concept of Law presents Hart's theory of legal positivism—the view that laws are rules made by humans and that there is no inherent or necessary connection between law and morality—within the framework of analytic philosophy. Hart sought to provide a theory of descriptive sociology and analytical jurisprudence. The book addresses a number of traditional jurisprudential topics such as the nature of law, whether laws are rules, and the relation between law and morality. Hart answers these by placing law into a social context while at the same time leaving the capability for rigorous analysis of legal terms, which in effect "awakened English jurisprudence from its comfortable slumbers".

Hart's book has remained "one of the most influential texts of analytical legal philosophy", as well as "the most successful work of analytical jurisprudence ever to appear in the common law world." According to Nicola Lacey, The Concept of Law "remains, 40 years after its publication, the main point of reference for teaching analytical jurisprudence and, along with Kelsen’s The Pure Theory of Law and General Theory of Law and State, the starting point for jurisprudential research in the analytic tradition."

== Background ==
The Concept of Law emerged from Hart's initial lectures as Oxford Professor of Jurisprudence following Arthur Goodhart's retirement, in 1952. Among Hart's early lectures on law that are expanded in the book is his 1953 essay titled, "Definition and Theory in Jurisprudence." Hart's discussion of Austin's legal positivism, the separation of law and morality, and the open-texture of legal rules can be seen in his April 1957 presentation of the Oliver Wendell Holmes Lecture at Harvard Law School titled, "Positivism and the Separation of Law and Morals." The book developed a sophisticated view of legal positivism.

Among the ideas developed in the book are:

- A critique of John Austin's theory that law is the command of the sovereign backed by sanction.
- A distinction between primary and secondary legal rules, where a primary rule governs conduct and a secondary rule allows the creation, alteration, or extinction of primary rules.
- A distinction between the internal and external points of view of law and rules, close to (and influenced by) Max Weber's distinction between the sociological and the legal perspectives of law.
- The idea of the rule of recognition, a social rule that differentiated between those norms that have the authority of law and those that do not. Hart viewed the rule of recognition as an evolution from Hans Kelsen's 'basic norm' (German: Grundnorm).
- In the postscript to the second edition (1994): A reply to Ronald Dworkin, who criticized legal positivism in general and especially Hart's account of law in Taking Rights Seriously, A Matter of Principle, and Law's Empire.

== Persistent questions ==
Hart begins The Concept of Law with a chapter titled "Persistent Questions." In the chapter, he lays out what he describes as "three recurrent issues." Hart poses three recurring questions central to legal theory: How does law differ from, and how is it related to, orders backed by threats? How does legal obligation differ from, and how is it related to, moral obligation? What are rules, and to what extent is law a matter of rules?

== Austin's "command theory" ==
The starting point for the discussion is Hart's dissatisfaction with John Austin's "command theory": a jurisprudential concept that holds that law is a series of commands backed by the threat of sanction or punishment. Hart likens Austin's theory to the role of a gunman in a bank and tries to establish the differences between the gunman's orders and those made by law. (For instance, the gunman forces us to obey but we may not feel inclined to obey him. Presumably, obedience to the law comes with a different feeling.)

Hart identifies three such important differences: content, origin, and range. In terms of content, not all laws are imperative or coercive. Some are facilitative, allowing us to create contracts and other legal relations. In terms of origin, not all laws are commands of a sovereign backed by sanctions. Some are rules made by the people themselves, such as customary rules or constitutional rules. In terms of range, not all laws are general and abstract. Some are particular and concrete, such as judicial decisions or administrative orders.

Austin believed that every legal system had to have a sovereign who creates the law (origin) while remaining unaffected by it (range), such as the bank scene's gunman, who is the only source of commands and who is not subject to other's commands. Hart argues that this is an inaccurate description of law, noting that laws may have several sources and legislators are very often subject to the laws they create. Hart lets us know that laws are much broader in scope than coercive orders, contrary to the "command theory" of Austin. Frequently laws are enabling and so allow citizens to carry out authoritative acts such as the making of wills or contracts which have legal effect.

== Social habits and rules ==
Hart draws a distinction between a social habit—such as going to the cinema on Thursdays, which people follow regularly but can break without facing disapproval—and a social rule, where breaking the rule is regarded as wrong, such as failing to remove one’s hat upon entering a church. Social rules carry a sense of obligation, and laws often appear to be a specific type of social rule.

There are two perspectives to this: the external aspect, which is the independently observable fact that people do tend to obey the rule with regularity, and the internal aspect which is the feeling by an individual of being in some sense obligated to follow the rule, otherwise known as the critical reflective attitude. It is from this internal sense that the law acquires its normative quality. The obedience by the populace of a rule is called efficacy. No law can be said to be efficacious unless followed by the majority of the populace. Though an average citizen in a modern state with a developed legal system may feel the internal aspect and be compelled to follow the laws, it is more important for the officials of the society/peoples to have the internal aspect since it is up to them to follow the constitutional provisions which, if they wish, they could ignore without accountability. Yet, the officials must use the internal aspect and accept the standards as guiding their behaviour in addition to also guiding the behaviour of other officials.

== Hart's empirical legal system in The Concept of Law ==
Hart believed law is the union of primary rules (rules of conduct) and secondary rules (empowering rules).

=== Primary rules ===
Primary rules are rules, or laws, that govern general societal conduct. Thus, primary rules construct legal obligations and consequences when they are disobeyed. A good example of primary rule is the law against murder; it prohibits a person from killing and attaches consequences for committing, attempting to commit, and conspiring to commit the crime.

=== Secondary rules ===
Secondary rules are rules about rules. A good example of a secondary rule is a law specifying who gets to write laws and how they are made valid laws of a legal system. A secondary rule might confer power to create sovereignty; they also confer the power to change, modify, or enforce primary (and secondary) rules. Secondary rules combat the three major issues of legal systems that primary rules can't–(1) uncertainty of the law, (2) inefficiency of the law, and (3) static quality of the law. Each kind of secondary rule addresses a separate one of those three issues, yet all are interdependent. Hart separates secondary rules into three types–the rules of recognition, the rules of change, and the rules of adjudication.

==== Rules of recognition ====
Hart states that the remedy for the uncertainty of the regime of primary rules is a rule of recognition. The rule of recognition is a collection of standards and requisites that govern the validity of all rules; thus, the rule of recognition confers power to new rules by validating them. For a rule to be valid is to recognize it as passing all the tests provided by the rule of recognition.

==== Rules of change ====
There are no legal systems that can be classified as pareto optimal. The next best thing is to make sure that the system does not remain at a static quality but instead is dynamic and progressive. The remedy for the static quality of the regime of primary rules are rules of change. Generally, rules of change confer and prohibit power of the creation, extinction and alteration of primary and secondary rules. Rules of change range in complexity: “the powers conferred may be unrestricted or limited in various ways: and the rules may, besides specifying the persons who are to legislate, define in more or less rigid terms the procedure to be followed in legislation.” As mentioned earlier, rules of change are interdependent with the other rules. Hart emphasizes the “close connection between the rules of change and the rules of recognition.” Where rules of change exist, rules of recognition "ʺwill necessarily incorporate a reference to legislation as an identifying feature of the rules, though it need not refer to all the details of procedure involved in legislation.”

==== Rules of adjudication ====
Rules of adjudication were intended to remedy the inefficiency of its diffused social pressure. Rules of adjudication empower individuals to make authoritative determinations of the question whether, on a particular occasion, a primary rule has been broken. Rules of adjudication govern the election and procedure of the judiciary. However, intermingled with who adjudicates is what laws they adjudicate. Under that logic, rules of adjudication, like rules of change, must also be supplemented by rules of recognition of some sort. Thus, “the rule which confers jurisdiction will also be a rule of recognition, identifying the primary rules through the judgments of the courts and these judgments will become a 'source' of law.”

== Other jurisprudential philosophers ==
- John Austin
- Ronald Dworkin
- Duncan Kennedy
- John Finnis
- Jeremy Bentham
- Max Weber
- Hans Kelsen
- Carl Schmitt
