= Hugo Krabbe =

Dutch legal philosopher (1857–1936)

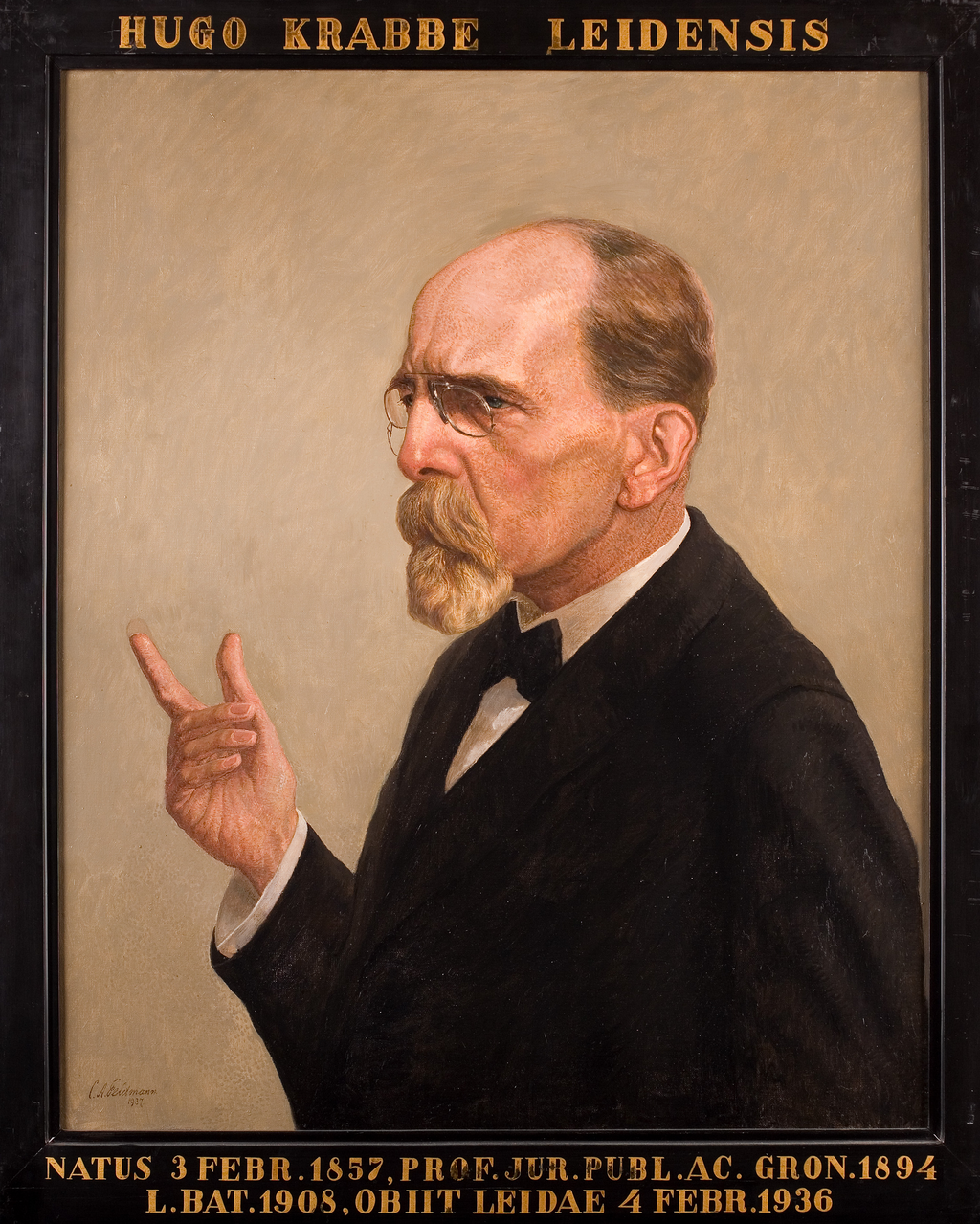
- Detail from Carl Albert Feldmann's 1937 portrait
- Born: 3 February 1857; Leiden, Netherlands
- Died: 4 February 1936 (aged 79); Leiden, Netherlands
- Occupation: Professor
- Years active: 1894–1927
- Spouse: Adriana Petronella Anna Regina Tavenraat
- Children: 2, including Maria Krabbe

Academic background
- Education: Stedelijk Gymnasium Leiden
- Alma mater: Leiden University
- Thesis: De burgerlijke staatsdienst in Nederland (1883)
- Doctoral advisor: Johannes Theodorus Buys

Academic work
- Discipline: Public law and legal philosophy
- Institutions: University of Groningen; Leiden University
- Doctoral students: Roelof Kranenburg
- Notable works: Die Lehre der Rechtssouveränität (1906); De moderne Staatsidee (1915); Kritische Darstellung der Staatslehre (1930)
- Notable ideas: Sovereignty of Law; Monism in International Law

Hugo Krabbe (3 February 1857 – 4 February 1936) was a Dutch legal philosopher and writer on public law. Known for his contributions to the theory of sovereignty and the state, he is regarded as a precursor of Hans Kelsen. Also Krabbe identified the state with the law and argued that state law and international law are parts of a single normative system, but contrary to Kelsen he conceived the identity between state and law as the outcome of an evolutionary process. Krabbe maintained that the binding force of the law is founded on the "legal consciousness" of mankind: a normative feeling inherent to human psychology. His work is expressive of the progressive and cosmopolitan ideals of interwar internationalism, and his notion of "sovereignty of law" stirred up much controversy in the legal scholarship of the time.

== Life ==
Hugo Krabbe was born on 3 February 1857 in Leiden to a Dutch Reformed minister, Christiaan Krabbe, and his wife, Maria Adriana Machteld Scholten. He received his education at the Stedelijk Gymnasium in Leiden and studied law and political science at the local university.

While at the university, he already began working as a clerk in administration. On 2 July 1883, he obtained his doctorate in law with the dissertation De burgerlijke staatsdienst in Nederland ("The civil state service in the Netherlands"), under the supervision of Johannes Theodorus Buys. Krabbe was subsequently appointed as a law clerk in the provincial courts first of Gelderland and then of North Holland, where he served as adjunct-commies and commies-chef respectively. In 1886, he married the daughter of the Romantic landscape painter Johannes Tavenraat (1809–1881), Adriana Petronella Anna Regina Tavenraat, with whom he had one son and one daughter, Maria Krabbe (1889–1965).

In 1888, he was attached to the Ministry of the Interior as hoofdcommies. Under the direction of the minister Tak van Poortvliet (progressive liberals) he played an important role in drafting a proposal for reform of the electoral system that, had it been approved, would have extended the right to vote to all male citizens who could read and write and who were self-supporting. The reform was seen as an attempt to introduce universal suffrage, which the 1887 constitution had expressly rejected, and was met with strong opposition. Tak van Poortvliet was forced to resign in 1894, and Krabbe's career in public administration came to an end.

Partly through Tak van Poortvliet's intercession, Krabbe was in 1894 appointed professor of constitutional and administrative law at the University of Groningen, where he succeeded Jacques Oppenheim, who had moved to the University of Leiden. He accepted the professorship with an inaugural address on 2 February 1894 on De werkkring van den staat ("The scope of action of the state"). When Oppenheim was appointed to the Council of State, Krabbe joined Leiden University as his successor. On 4 March 1908 he accepted the professorship of constitutional and administrative law with an inaugural address on De idee der persoonlijkheid in de staatsleer ("The idea of personality in the theory of the state").

Krabbe remained at Leiden University teaching international law and public law for the rest of his career. Among his notable students at Leiden were Roelof Kranenburg (1880–1956), a constitutional lawyer and politician, and the economist Gijsbert Weijer Jan Bruins. His teaching is also said to have influenced constitutionalists and politicians such as Ernst van Raalte (1892–1975), Frederik Johan Albert Huart (1896–1935), Ivo Samkalden (1912–1995) and Johan Jozef Boasson (1882–1967). In 1923–1924, Krabbe served as a rector. In 1927 he retired with a farewell lecture on his flagship topic, Staat en recht ("State and law"): "the core of constitutional law, which I have taught for 33 years". Three years after resigning as professor, he published his Kritische Darstellung der Staatslehre ("Critical presentation of the theory of the state") but soon retired as chairman of the "Vereeniging voor Wijsbegeerte des Rechts" (Association for the philosophy of law), which had been set up in 1919 partly on his initiative.

Krabbe died in Leiden on 4 February 1936, aged 79.

== Doctrine ==
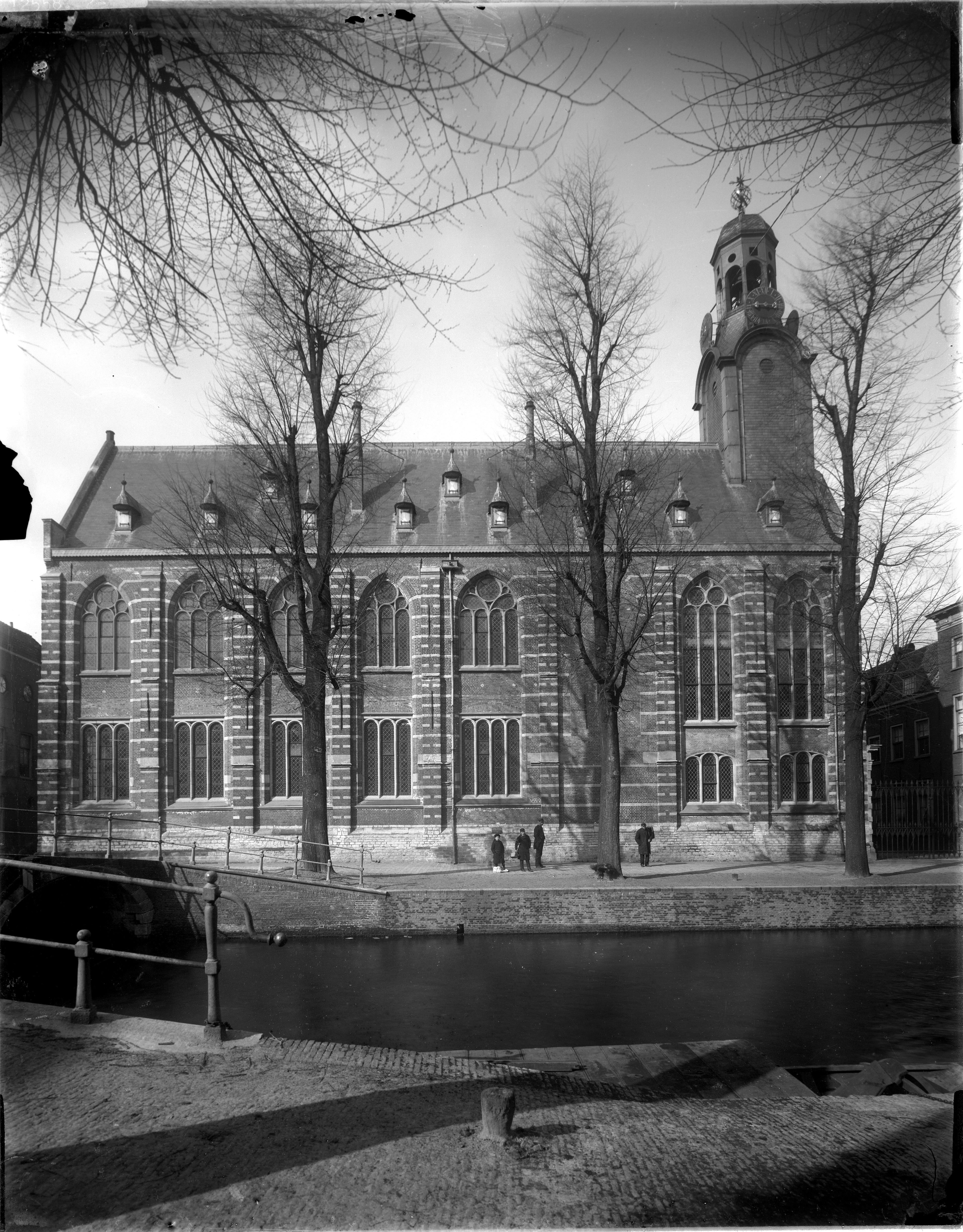
Leiden University, Academy building (1897)

=== Main themes ===
Shortly before the start of World War I, Krabbe developed a theory of law and state that was destined to stir up much controversy in the interwar period. Some of its main ideas can be summarised as follows:

- The state is identical to its legal order, and the authority of the state is nothing but the binding force of its law. The notion of state sovereignty, central to the legal positivist doctrine of the time, must be replaced with the notion of "sovereignty of law" (rechtssouvereiniteit), which better expresses the objective and impersonal nature of authority in the modern state.
- The binding force of law is founded on "legal consciousness" or "juridical conscience" (rechtsbewustzijn, also translated "sense of right"), which is common to all mankind. Legal consciousness is a normative feeling inherent to human psychology, which explains and justifies the duty to obey the law. Legal consciousness also provides a linkage between the binding force of law and the democratic principle: as "social consensus on the legal validity of certain propositions", it evokes "the emancipatory power of the will of the people and the institutions of popular government".
- Rechtsbewustzijn is not limited to state law. International law, like any other law, is the product of the common legal consciousness; thus, state law and international law cannot be sharply distinguished and opposed one against the other: the validity of them both ultimately rests upon the same foundation – the rechtsbewustzijn.
- International law is not necessarily interstate law and can impose its obligations directly upon the individuals. There is no "adaptation" or "transformation" of international law into state law. International law is actually a "misnomer" as "it would be better [...] to speak of a supernational law, since this expresses the idea that we are dealing with a law which regulates a community of men embracing several states and which possesses a correspondingly higher validity than that attaching to national law". Thus, according to Krabbe international law must be regarded as a supranational legal system founded on a universal legal consciousness.
- The claim of a country to regulate its own communal life according to its own legal standards is conditioned upon the values and interests of the international community, and it is ultimately bound to wither as the political organisation slowly but inevitably moves towards the world state.

=== Theoretical and normative background ===
In Krabbe's time, Dutch public law doctrine was strongly influenced by legal positivism, which was either drawn from the English analytical jurisprudence of John Austin, Westel W. Willoughby and others, or from the German Staatsrechtslehre of Carl Friedrich von Gerber, Paul Laband, Rudolf von Jhering and Georg Jellinek. Both these strands of jurisprudence shared the idea that the ultimate foundation of the law lies in the will of the sovereign and/or in the will of the state. Krabbe rejected that idea and placed the notion of legal consciousness of humanity at the basis of legal normativity. Under the influence of the psychological theories of Gerardus Heymans, who was a personal friend of his while in Groningen and had helped him to translate some of his publications into German, Krabbe developed a naturalistic jurisprudence with a psychologically and sociologically grounded concept of law. Relatively close to Otto von Gierke, Hugo Preuss, Leon Duguit, Georges Scelle, Léon Michoud, Krabbe's work exhibits a strong normative orientation and emphasis on progressive and cosmopolitan ideals, which make it an exemplar of a psychologically inspired natural law theory:

On this natural mental faculty [rechtsbewustzijn] rests the validity of all law. There are no sources of law, as the textbooks teach; there is only one source of law, viz., the feeling or sense of right which resides in man and has a place in his conscious life, like all the other tendencies that give rise to judgments of value. Upon this all law is based, whether it be positive law, customary law, or the unwritten law in general. A statute which does not rest upon this foundation is not law; it lacks validity even though it be obeyed voluntarily or by compulsion.

=== Theory of sovereignty and state ===
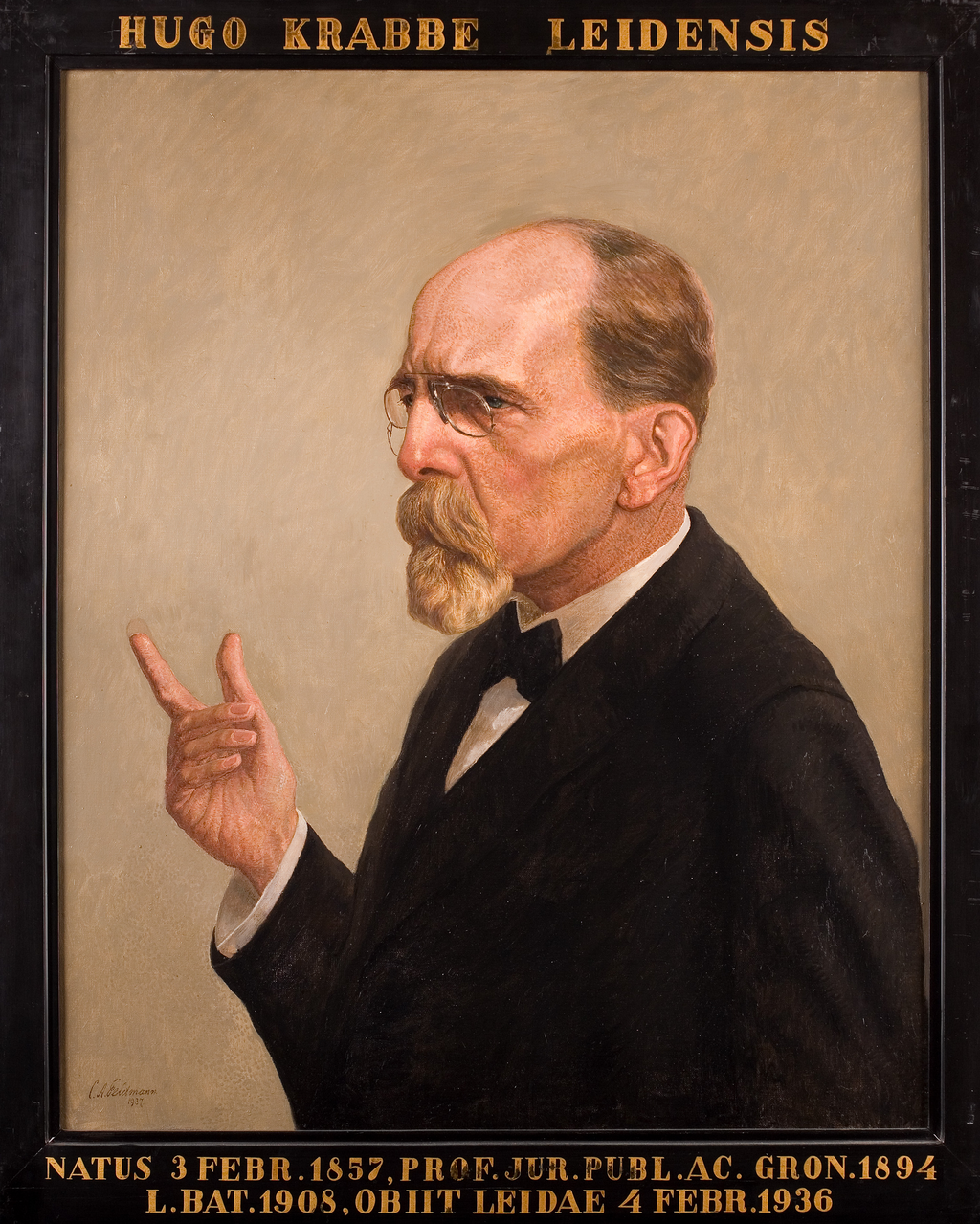
Portrait of Hugo Krabbe by Carl Albert Feldmann (1937), Leiden University Libraries

In 1906 Krabbe published in German his seminal book Die Lehre der Rechtssouveränität ("The theory of the sovereignty of law"), which has been one of the most controversial works in Dutch jurisprudence together with his following book De moderne staatsidee ("The Modern Idea of the State"), published in 1915 and soon translated into German, French and English. The English translation of the latter book was undertaken by two renowned American academics, the political philosopher Georg H. Sabine and the professor of political science Walter J. Shepard; their eighty-page translators' introduction attests to Krabbe's international standing, his topicality at the time and the salience of his contribution to the international liberal values during the interwar period often associated with Wilsonianism. (Note: Schmidt 1998, p. 448 notes the influence of "Krabbe's pluralistic account of sovereignty and law" on Edwin M. Borchard – a leading critic of the theory of sovereignty as it applied to international law.)

Krabbe countered the theory of state sovereignty with the notion of sovereignty of law, which he saw as an evolutionary accomplishment of the modern state. As milestones of the road to the modern state, he pointed to Thomas More's Utopia, in which culture rather than power is the purpose of the state, Hugo Grotius's natural law theory, and the notion of volonté générale at the heart of Rousseau's political philosophy. Krabbe also related the notion of sovereignty of law to the historical process towards an integrated world legal system and the emergence of what he called a "supranational law" taking precedence over national law (monism under international law). These cosmopolitan and progressive ideas, typical of the interwar "peace-through-law movement", (Note: Canihac 2019, p. 721, who also mentions Walther Schücking, Hans Wehberg, Erich Kaufmann, Max Huber and Alfred Verdross as advocates of "peace-through-law movement".) were often received with incredulity by the legal scholar of the time: Roelof Kranenburg, a loyal disciple, wrote that Krabbe had in him "as much of the prophet as of the professor".

The identification of state and law, and the idea that state law and international law are integrated into a single normative system were embraced in the 1920s by the leading Austrian public lawyer and legal philosopher Hans Kelsen, who recognised the debt he owed to Krabbe and praised his work as a "masterly critique of the German theory of public law". However, as Carl Schmitt noted in 1922, Krabbe did not subscribe to the neo-Kantian epistemological and methodological assumptions of Kelsen, and was rather engaged in a sociological investigation on the distinctive features of the modern state, where "[w]e no longer live under the authority of persons, be they natural or artificial (legal) persons, but under the rule of laws, (spiritual) forces. This is the essence of the modern idea of the state". Carl Schmitt, who was the representative of an anti-liberal and thoroughly authoritarian theory of the state, saw in Krabbe the revival of "the old liberal negation of the state vis-a-vis law", coupled with a stale and uninspiring sociological methodology: Krabbe, contrary to Kelsen, conceived the sovereignty of law and the identity of state and law as historically evolved achievements rather than necessary transcendental presuppositions of legal knowledge.

== Works ==
=== Books ===
- (1883). De burgerlijke staatsdienst in Nederland (in Dutch). Leiden: S. C. van Doesburgh read online
- (1886). De strafwetgevende bevoegdheid der Gemeentebesturen, toegelicht met het oog op de invoering van het nieuwe Strafwetboek (in Dutch). Haarlem: Mul & Vonk read online
- (1901). Administratieve rechtspraak (in Dutch). Groningen: Wolters read online
- (1906). Die Lehre der Rechtssouveranitat. Beitrag zur Staatslehre (in German). Groningen: Wolters read online
- (1915). De moderne staatsidee (in Dutch). 's-Gravenhage: Martinus Nijhoff read online
  - (1919). Die moderne Staatsidee (in German) (2 ed.). Haag: Martinus Nijhoff read online
  - (1922). The Modern Idea of the State. Translated by Sabine, George H.; Shepard, Walter J. The Hague: Nijhoff read online
  - (1926). L'idée moderne de l'État. Collected Courses of the Hague Academy of International Law. 13 (3) read online
  - (2006). Stella, Giuliana (ed.). L'idea moderna dello Stato (in Italian). Aracne. ISBN 978-88-7999-277-0.
- (1917). Het rechtsgezag. Verdediging en toelichting (in Dutch). 's-Gravenhage: Martinus Nijhoff read online
- (1930). Kritische Darstellung der Staatslehre (in German). Haag: Martinus Nijhoff read online

=== Essays and lectures ===
- (1894). De werkkring van den staat: redevoering bij de aanvaarding van het hoogleeraarambt aan de Rijks-Universiteit te Groningen, den 10 februari 1891 uitgesproken (in Dutch). Groningen: Wolters read online
- (1900). "Constitutioneele monarchie". De Gids (in Dutch). 64: 199–237 read online
- (1904). "Kiesrecht". De Gids (in Dutch). 68: 222–254 read online
- (1906). "De heerschappij der grondwet". De Gids (in Dutch). 70: 371–407 read online
- (1908). De idee der persoonlijkheid in de staatsleer: redevoering bij de aanvaarding van het hoogleeraarsambt aan de rijks-universiteit te Leiden, den 4 Maart 1908 uitgesproken (in Dutch). Groningen: Wolters read online
- (1910). "De eerste kamer". De Gids (in Dutch). 74: 48–89 read online
- (1912). "[Vierde deel]Grondwetsherziening". De Gids (in Dutch). 76: 1–27 read online
- (1915). "Het recht tot den oorlog". De Gids (in Dutch). 79: 311–346 read online
- (1916). "Compromis of capitulatie". De Gids (in Dutch). 80: 205–214 read online
- (1920). "Oud en modern staatsrecht". De Gids (in Dutch). 84: 427–456 read online
- (1924). De innerlijke waarde der wet: rectorale oratie (in Dutch). 's Gravenhage: Nijhoff read online
- (1927). "Staat en recht". De Gids (in Dutch). 91: 407–418 read online
- (1929). Natuurrecht: rede gehouden voor de vergadering van 23 Januari 1926 (in Dutch). Groningen: Vereeniging voor Wijsbegeerte des Rechts read online

=== Liber amicorum ===
- Staatsrechtelijke opstellen: uitgegeven ter gelegenheid van het aftreden van Prof. H. Krabbe als hoogleeraar aan de Rijks Universiteit te Leiden. Handelingen van de Vereeniging voor Wijsbegeerte des Rechts (in Dutch). Vol. 12. Groningen: Vereeniging voor Wijsbegeerte des Recht. 1927 read online

== Notes and references ==
=== Sources on Krabbe ===
- "Prof. Mr. H. Krabbe 70 Jaar". Leidsch Dagblad (in Dutch). 2 February 1927. p. 1.
- "Prof. Mr. Hugo Krabbe †". Leidsch Dagblad (in Dutch). 5 February 1936. p. 1.
- Elzinga, D.J. (1990). "Leven en werk van Hugo Krabbe". De staat van het recht. Opstellen over staatsrecht en politiek (in Dutch). Tjeenk Willink. ISBN 9027132402.
- Kiewiet, Jeroen (2018). "Legal Unity as Political Unity? Carl Schmitt and Hugo Krabbe on the Catalonian Constitutional Crisis". Utrecht Journal of International and European Law. 34 (1): 56–72 (download PDF to find the page). doi:10.5334/ujiel.453. ISSN 2053-5341.
- Kranenburg, Roelof (1937a). "Hugo Krabbe (Leiden 3 Februari 1857-Leiden 4 Februari 1936)". Jaarboek van de Maatschappij der Nederlandse Letterkunde (in Dutch): 155–169.
- Kranenburg, Roelof (1937b). "Prof. Mr. H. Krabbe". Jaarboekje voor Geschiedenis en Oudheidkunde van Leiden en Rijnland (in Dutch). 29. Leiden: P. J. Mulder & Zoon: LIV–LV.
- Navari, Cornelia (2021). "The Recovery of Vitoria and Suarez, and the Apprehension of a World Society: Krabbe, Verdross and Leon Duguit". The International Society Tradition. Palgrave Studies in International Relations. Palgrave Macmillan. pp. 105–119. doi:10.1007/978-3-030-77018-1_8. ISBN 978-3-030-77017-4. S2CID 238940448.
- Peletier, W. M. (12 November 2013). "Krabbe, Hugo (1857–1936)". Huygens ING. Biografisch Woordenboek van Nederland (in Dutch).
- Stella, Giuliana (2013). "Hugo Krabbe: la sovranità del diritto". Sovranità e diritti: La dottrina dello Stato da Jellinek a Schmitt (in Italian). Torino: Giappichelli. pp. 53–70. ISBN 978-88-348-7925-2.
- Stella, Giuliana (2016). "Precursors of the Pure Theory of Law: Hugo Krabbe". In Pattaro, Enrico; Roversi, Corrado (eds.). Legal Philosophy in the Twentieth Century: The Civil Law World. Tome 1: Language Areas. A Treatise of Legal Philosophy and General Jurisprudence. Vol. 12. Springer. pp. 65–71. doi:10.1007/978-94-007-1479-3. ISBN 978-94-007-1478-6.

=== Other quoted sources ===
- Bernstorff, Jochen von (2010). The Public International Law Theory of Hans Kelsen. Believing in Universal Law. Cambridge University Press. ISBN 978-0-521-51618-1.
- Canihac, Hugo (2019). "From nostalgia to Utopia: A Genealogy of French Conceptions of Supranationality (1848–1948)". Modern Intellectual History. 17 (3): 707–736. doi:10.1017/S1479244318000562. hdl:2078.3/211257. ISSN 1479-2443. S2CID 151032826.
- Congleton, Roger D. (2011). Perfecting Parliament. Constitutional Reform, Liberalism, and the Rise of Western Democracy. Cambridge University Press. ISBN 9780521764605.
- Dullaart, M.H.J. (12 November 2013). "Bruins, Gijsbert Weijer Jan (1883–1948)". Huygens ING. Biografisch Woordenboek van Nederland (in Dutch).
- Eyffinger, Arthur (2019). "The Context of the Hague Conferences". T.M.C. Asser (1838–1913) (2 vols.). Legal History Library, 31/13. Brill Nijhoff. pp. 694–731. doi:10.1163/9789004397972_028. ISBN 978-90-04-39797-2. S2CID 203376387.
- Gragl, Paul (2018). Legal Monism: Law, Philosophy, and Politics. Oxford University Press. ISBN 978-0-19-879626-8.
- Kelsen, Hans (1920). Das Problem der Souveränität und die Theorie des Völkerrechts (in German). Tübingen: Mohr.
- Kolla, Edward James (2017). Sovereignty, International Law, and the French Revolution. Cambridge University Press. ISBN 978-1-107-17954-7.
- Koskenniemi, Martti (2002). The Gentle Civilizer of Nations: The Rise and Fall of International Law, 1870–1960. Cambridge, UK: Cambridge University Press. ISBN 0-511-04000-8. OCLC 56219945.
- Kossman, Ernst Heinrich (1978). The Low Countries, 1780–1940. Oxford: Clarendon Press. ISBN 0-19-822108-8.
- Krabbe, Hugo (1919). Die moderne Staatsidee (in German) (2 ed.). Haag: Martinus Nijhoff.
- Krabbe, Hugo (1922). The Modern Idea of the State. Translated by Sabine, George H.; Shepard, Walter J. The Hague: Nijhoff.
- Krabbe, Hugo (1927). "Staat en recht". De Gids (in Dutch). 91: 407–418.
- Krabbe, Hugo (1930). Kritische Darstellung der Staatslehre (in German). Haag: Martinus Nijhoff.
- La Torre, Massimo (2010). Law as Institution. Law and Philosophy Library. Vol. 90. Dordrecht London: Springer. doi:10.1007/978-1-4020-6607-8. ISBN 978-1-4020-6606-1. OCLC 668098876.
- Schmidt, Brian C. (1998). "Lessons from the Past. Reassessing the Interwar Disciplinary History of International Relations". International Studies Quarterly. 42 (3): 433–459. doi:10.1111/0020-8833.00091. ISSN 0020-8833. JSTOR 2600746.
- Schmitt, Carl (2005) [Originally published in 1922, revised edition in 1934]. Political Theology. Four Chapters on the Concept of Sovereignty. Translated by Schwab, George. Chicago and London: University of Chicago Press. ISBN 978-0-226-73889-5.
- Simma, Bruno (1995). "The Contribution of Alfred Verdross to the Theory of International Law" (PDF). European Journal of International Law. 6 (1). Oxford University Press: 33–54. doi:10.1093/ejil/6.1.33. ISSN 0938-5428.
- Stolleis, Michael (2001). "Schmitt, Carl". In Stolleis, Michael (ed.). Juristen. Ein Biographisches Lexikon (in German). Munich: C.H. Beck. pp. 562–3. ISBN 3406459579.
- Wilson, Francis G. (1934). "A Relativistic View of Sovereignty". Political Science Quarterly. 49 (3): 386–410. doi:10.2307/2143219. ISSN 0032-3195. JSTOR 2143219.
