= Alfred Verdross =

Austrian lawyer and judge (1890–1980)

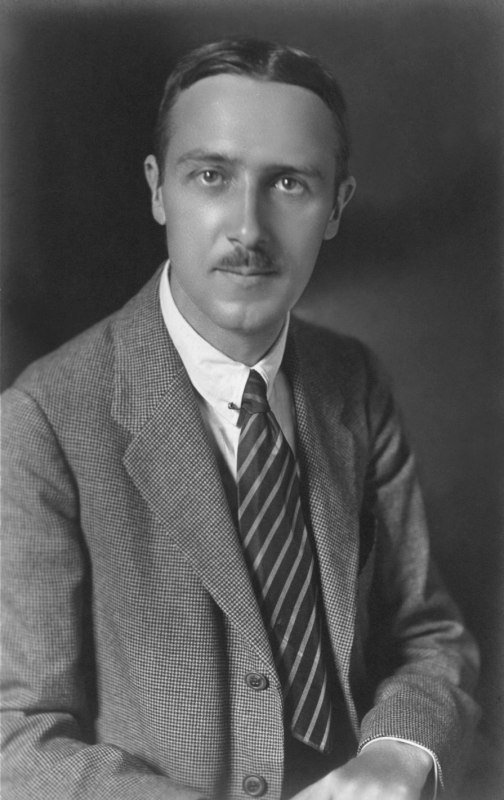
- Verdross in 1927
- Born: 22 February 1890; Innsbruck, Austria-Hungary
- Died: 27 April 1980 (aged 90); Innsbruck, Austria
- Occupation: Professor
- Years active: 1924–1961
- Board member of: International Law Commission (1957–1966); Permanent Court of Arbitration (1958–1977); European Court of Human Rights (1959–1977); President of the Institut de Droit International (1959–1961)

Academic background
- Education: University of Vienna

Academic work
- Discipline: International law, Philosophy of Law
- Institutions: University of Vienna
- Notable ideas: Monism in International Law; ius cogens

Alfred Verdross or Verdroß or Verdroß-Droßberg (until 1919, Edler von Droßberg; 22 February 1890, Innsbruck, Austria-Hungary – 27 April 1980, Innsbruck, Austria) was an Austrian international lawyer and judge at the European Court of Human Rights.

After having served as an Austrian foreign ministry official, he became professor of public international law, private international law and philosophy of law at the University of Vienna. He was a pan-German nationalist and an early sympathizer with Nazism, but did not join the Nazi party. Following the German occupation of Austria, he was suspended from his teaching assignments, but from mid-1939 onwards he was allowed to resume the teaching of international law. After the end of World War II he continued his academic career in Vienna and became, among other things, member of the International Law Commission, member of the Permanent Court of Arbitration, president of the Institut de Droit International and, from 1959 to 1977, judge at the European Court of Human Rights.

Together with Hans Kelsen, Adolf Merkl and Josef L. Kunz, he was one the main exponents of the Vienna school of legal theory. He was an early proponent and chief theorist of the ius cogens doctrine and of the monist theory of the relationship between international and national law, and is considered one of the most influential international lawyers of the 20th century.

== Life ==
=== Early years ===
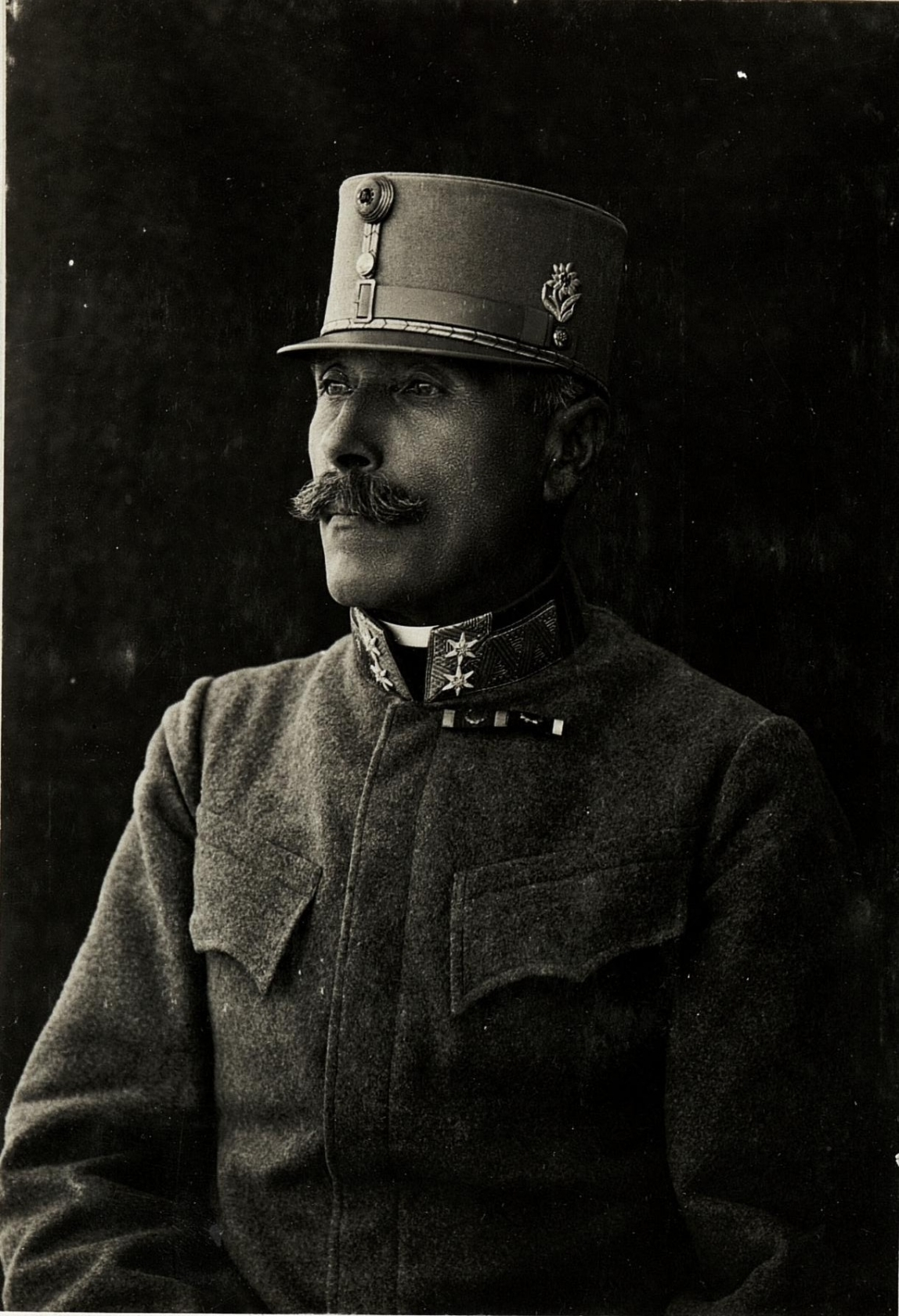
Alfred Verdross's father, General Ignaz Verdroß-Droßberg, Commander of the Kaiserjäger Division, after 1915

Alfred Verdross was born on 22 February 1890 in Innsbruck as the son of the then lieutenant and later general of the Austro-Hungarian army, Ignaz Verdroß von Droßberg. He attended school in Rovereto and Brixen and then studied law at the University of Vienna, the Ludwig-Maximilians-Universität München (with Franz Brentano), and the University of Lausanne. In 1913, he was awarded a doctorate at the University of Vienna. As a student at the University of Vienna, he met Hans Kelsen, whose private seminars he attended during World War I.

In 1916, Verdross passed the judges' examination and subsequently entered military service as first lieutenant auditor (Oberleutnantauditor) at the Supreme Military Court (Oberster Militärgerichtshof) in Vienna. Before the end of the war, on 15 January 1918 Verdross left the military service and was assigned to the legal services of the Imperial and Royal Foreign Ministry. After the collapse of the Austro-Hungarian Monarchy he became secretary to the Austrian Legation in Berlin. In this capacity, he was among the experts who in December 1918 contributed to the parliamentary debates leading up to the drafting of the Weimar Constitution, and in 1919 an essay of his succeeded in persuading the parliamentary Constitutional commission to redraft the constitutional provision on international law. In December 1920 he returned to Vienna, where he was employed in the International Law Department of the Ministry for Foreign Affairs until 1924, and from 1923 also as a professor at the Consular Academy. He habilitated at the University of Vienna in 1921. In 1924 was appointed associate professor (außerordentlicher Professor) of philosophy of law and in 1925 full professor of public international law, private international law and philosophy of law at the University of Vienna, where he served as a member of the Law Faculty until his retirement in 1961.

After 1924 Verdross became director and coeditor of the Zeitschrift für öffentliches Recht ("Journal of Public Law"), a public law journal founded upon the initiative of Kelsen, who also worked as an editor. In 1927 he was elected a correspondent member of the Institute for International Law in Kiel and in 1928, an associate of the Institut de droit international. In 1927 he gave his first Hague Lectures, followed by his general course in 1929 and two monographic courses in 1931 and 1935; in 1931 he became a member of the Curatorium of the Hague Academy of International Law. In 1926–1929, he was appointed substitute member of the Austrian Constitutional Court, in 1928, and in 1931–1933 Dean of the Vienna Faculty of Law.

Austria moved decisively toward an autocratic fascist state when Chancellor Dollfuss began ruling by decree after the self- elimination of parliament in 1933. Verdross was offered a position as Minister of Justice, but refused, although he was personally not hostile to the values of Austrofascism. Together with the law school deans of Graz and Innsbruck, he even lodged a formal protest against the breach of the constitution by the new authoritarian government. He agreed to join Dolfuss's Austrian nationalist party, the Fatherland Front, only on the condition that he would not renounce "the ultimate goal of the unification of all Germans", i.e., his pan-Germanist ideals.

In 1935 he was appointed as an extraordinary member of the Federal Supreme Court and in 1937 he was elected as Corresponding Member of the Austrian Academy of Sciences. In the same year, he founded the Austrian branch of the London-based anti-war organisation The New Commonwealth, which advocated for the establishment of a world court to adjudicate international disputes and an international police force to enforce its decisions.

=== Relationship with Nazism ===
Verdross was a Catholic conservative whose political views during the interwar years have been described as attachment to the values of the Austro-Hungarian Empire and hostility to the people's right of self-determination, hope for a "Christian-occidental Europe" in the tradition of the Holy Roman Empire, and endorsement of pan-Germanist nationalism under the influence of Othmar Spann's communitarianism and Austrofascism.

The exact extent of Verdross's sympathy for Nazism remains debated, and his relationship with the fascist government is a matter of controversy. He was an early sympathiser with Nazism and was active in DNSAP circles even after the party was outlawed in 1933. He was popular among German nationalist and Nazi students and often intervened on their behalf, but on one occasion he also protected Jewish and democratic students from a Nazi attack at the university. In 1933–1934 his assistant at the Consular Academy was Friedrich August Freiherr von der Heydte, at the time an SA member, whom he had recommended to Kelsen in Cologne. In 1934, his personal friendship with Kelsen came to an end when Kelsen was forced by the editorial board of the Zeitschrift für öffentliches Recht to resign as editor on the grounds that he was Jewish. (Note: The personal friendship with Kelsen was restored in 1945 through Josef Laurenz Kunz's mediation. In 1948 Kelsen wrote in a letter to Verdross: "It is true that I was somewhat disgruntled. I was upset that I was forced to resign as the main editor of the Zeitschrift für öffentliches Recht even before the Anschluss. I was also of the opinion that you had gone too far with certain political value judgements in your Völkerrecht – by far the best presentation of the subject in the German language. But I have never blamed you in the least for staying in the homeland and have always fully understood that this was not possible without making certain concessions.")

In his successful 1937 textbook on international law, Verdross attempted to bring Nazism and Catholic-inspired universalism closer together. The book calls Mussolini a defender of Christian values, characterises the Nazist doctrine of international law as "anti-imperalist and federalist", (Note: "As the guardian of the Roman tradition, [the Italian foreign policy] defends Christian occidental values and the order that sustains them ... since it recognises the individual development of all peoples and rejects the amalgamation of foreign nations, the National Socialist doctrine of international law is anti-imperalist and federalist and therefore fundamentally different from the nationalism of the pre-war period.") and contains significant traces of a völkisch approach to legal studies and international politics. (Note: "But if Volkstum [ethnic nationhood] constitutes the highest natural form of humanity, every person can attain the development of his natural talents only within the Volksgemeinschaft [national community]. With this, the Volkstum becomes the natural foundation of all culture. The political unity of the state, too, must do justice to this fact, since the state, by its very conception, forms the perfect community of life (civitas perfecta) for its members, but can fulfill this task only if it makes it possible for them to bring their natural talents and abilities to fruition. However, as a result of the natural [artmäßige] diversity of humanity, such a formation is possible only in the Volksgemeinschaft. The most perfect realization of this idea is possible in pure nation states.")

Verdross showed no qualms about contact with Nazism, but never joined the Nazi party either before or after the annexation of Austria into the German Reich in 1938. After the annexation he was temporarily suspended from his teaching assignments in the summer of 1938, but accommodated to political pressure and, from 1939, thanks to the support of the Nazi rector of the university, the legal historian Ernst Schönbauer, and the intervention of General Jodl, he was allowed to resume the teaching of international law, after adapting the content of his lectures to the demands of the new rulers. He was never allowed to resume the teaching of philosophy of law, probably because his natural law theory based on Christian values was deemed incompatible with the ideology of the regime. He managed to come to terms with the Nazi government and in 1942 was appointed alternate judge at the German Prize Court of Appeals (Oberprisenhof) and director of the Institute of Legal Sciences at the university of Vienna.

=== Post-war ===
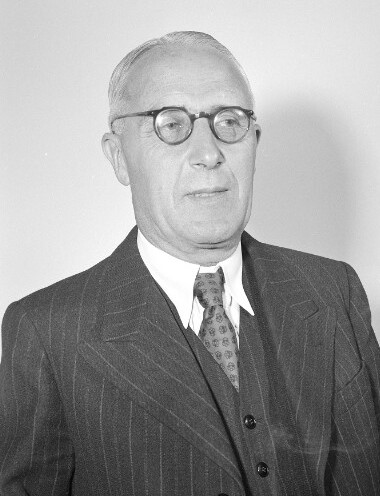
Alfred Verdross in 1950

After the end of World War II, Verdross continued his career without undergoing the denazification process. He regained his academic position in 1945. He served as the Dean of the Faculty of Law in 1946–1947 and again in 1958–1959, was nominated as a full professor in 1947, and was the Rector of the University of Vienna from 1951–1952. In 1950, he was elected a member of the Austrian Academy of Sciences and of the Institut de Droit International (from 1977, honorary member). In 1956, he was appointed by the United Nations General Assembly as the first Austrian member of the International Law Commission – a body of experts mainly concerned with the codification of international law – where he served from 1957 to 1966. From 1958 to 1977 he also served as a member of the Permanent Court of Arbitration of The Hague and from 1959 to 1961 as president of the Institut de droit international. In 1957, he declined a nomination as a joint candidate for the Federal Presidency of the Austrian People's Party and the Austrian Freedom Party against the later victorious Adolf Schärf.

In 1959, Verdross became a judge of the newly created European Court of Human Rights, where he sat for two terms until 1977. In 1961, he was President of the Vienna Conference on Diplomatic Relations. Until 1977, he was also a member of the Curatorium of the Hague Academy of International Law, where he taught at least five courses. His textbook Völkerrecht ("International law"), which first appeared in 1937, soon became the leading treatise on international law in the German language, translated into both Spanish and Russian. Verdross came to be regarded as one of the most authoritative international lawyers of the 20th century, not least because of the resurgence of natural law theory in post-war Austria and Germany: Verdross became one of the most celebrated protagonists in this revival.

Verdross died on 27 April 1980 in Innsbruck, the city where he was born.

== Doctrine ==
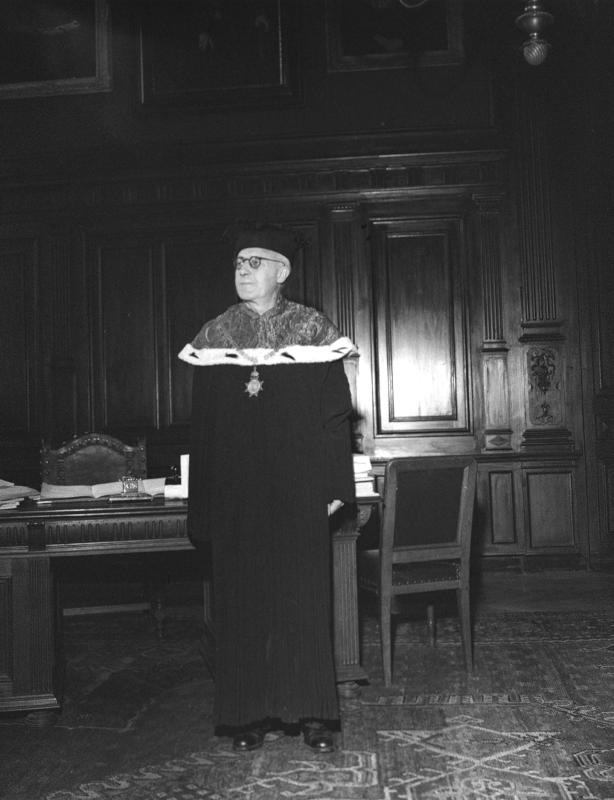
Alfred Verdross during a doctoral graduation at the University of Vienna in 1952

Alongside Adolf Merkl and Josef Laurenz Kunz, Verdross was one of Hans Kelsen's most important pupils and a leading exponent of the Vienna school of legal theory. Many of his contributions to the study of international law are based on Kelsen's theory of law and the state, which Verdross largely embraced, including the idea of the unity of law, the hierarchical structure of the legal system (so-called Stufenbau) and the concept of basic norm (Grundnorm).

Thus, as early as 1921, Verdross followed Kelsen's lead and abandoned his initial "monism with primacy of state law", according to which international and national law constitute a single legal system in which national law enjoys supremacy. He also rejected the prevailing theory of the time, Triepel's "dualism", according to which international and national law constitute two separate legal systems, based on different grounds of validity and addressed to different subjects. Instead, in line with the revival of the universalist approach to international law initiated by the Dutch scholar Hugo Krabbe and continued by Kelsen, Verdross subscribed to "monism with primacy of international law", a position he already expounded in his 1923 book Die Einheit des rechtlichen Weltbildes ("The Unity of the Legal World-View"). From that universalist perspective, international and national law are parts of a single, unitary legal system, largely effective and endowed with the power of coercion; within that common frame, international law prevails over national law and determines the scope of legitimate state action. Anticipating Kelsen, who later accepted Verdross's views in his Pure Theory of Law, Verdross admitted that in case of conflict between international law and national law the latter is not per se null and void, but remains valid until it is formally repealed or amended to make it compatible with international law: national law retains a temporary, provisional, validity (so-called "moderate monism").

These conclusions were largely based on the rejection, shared by Verdross and Kelsen, of the dogma of absolute state sovereignty and voluntarist legal positivism: sovereignty is no longer the "supreme power" but only a competence conferred on the state directly by international law; international law is not founded on the consent of states and therefore states can in principle be bound by rules to which they have not agreed. In Verdross' work, the "fight against voluntarist legal positivism" was the premise for further doctrinal developments, including the possibility of recognising as sources of international law, alongside the law of treaties and customary law, also the "general principles of law recognized by civilised nations". In a 1931 essay, Verdross explained that these fundamental principles originate from the legal consciousness of all modern civilised nations and are binding also upon states which have not consented to them. In a 1937 essay on "Forbidden Treaties" he argued that these principles forbid the conclusion of treaties contra bonos mores, that is, offensive to the conscience and sense of justice. In so doing, he became the chief theorist of the ius cogens doctrine that prevails today and that found its final breakthrough in the 1969 Vienna Convention on the Law of Treaties: he contended that all rules of general international law created for humanitarian purposes qualify as ius cogens, and that neither international treaties nor customary international law can override these fundamental principles upon which the international legal order is built. Verdross's work also had a strong influence on later theorization about the "constitutionalisation of international law".

Verdross also distanced himself from essential parts of Kelsen's theory. As early as 1923, he rejected Kelsen's moral relativism, turned away from his mentor's neo-Kantianism and legal positivism, and fully embraced objective idealism, the Aristotelian-Thomistic tradition of natural law, and the Wertphilosophie of Franz Brentano, Max Scheler and Nicolai Hartmann. (Note: In his Die Rechtstheorie Hans Kelsen's (1930), Verdross recommended that Kelsen should relinquish "the neo-Kantian prejudice that the method creates the object of enquiry".) The School of Salamanca in particular is said to be "so influential on Verdross that he virtually adopted it as the Leitmotiv of his entire international legal thinking".

Consequently, Verdross radically modified the Kelsenian theory of the basic norm. For Kelsen, the basic norm is simply "presupposed" by legal science, rather than created by some human or divine authority, and is "formal" because it can found the validity of any legal system, irrespective of the content of its norms. In contrast, Verdross's basic norm is neither presupposed nor formal: it is rooted in the objective realm of values and is both legal and moral. He believes that the social nature of human communities gives rise to objective values, and can therefore ascribe to the basic norm a substantive normative content, that of the fundamental principles of law, such as the safeguarding of human freedom, dignity and basic standards of inviolability. According to Martti Koskenniemi, in filling the basic norm with natural law principles, "Verdross used the pure theory so as to turn what Kelsen saw as political choice into an article of faith in fundamental values. This was the language of Austrian Catholicism that did little to prevent the country’s descent into Nazism".

From the mid-1930s onwards, the gulf between Kelsen and his former pupil Verdross widened, as the latter took up some of the ethno-nationalist themes then in vogue and began to argue that the Volkstum constitutes "the highest natural form of humanity" and that "every person can attain the development of his natural talents only within the Volksgemeinschaft", thus moving away from Kelsen's and his school's rejection of nationalism.

== Legacy ==
Verdross is regarded as the founder and leading exponent of the Viennese School of international law and legal philosophy based on natural law theory. According to Armin von Bogdandy and Ingo Venzke, he is "possibly the most important representative of Catholic natural law in the international law of the twentieth century". According to his disciple Bruno Simma, "[w]ithin the German-speaking countries, Alfred Verdross shaped international legal thinking in a way unparalleled in the past"; in the Austrian community of international law scholars, "everybody was exposed to and, to a greater or lesser degree, influenced by the teachings of the Viennese master".

Verdross's disciples include Stephan Verosta (1909–1998), who was his assistant in the 1930s and succeeded him in the chair of International Law and Legal Philosophy in 1962; Ignaz Seidl-Hohenveldern (1918–2001), who was Verdross's assistant immediately after World War II and became professor of International Law at the universities of Saarland, Cologne and lastly Vienna; Karl Zemanek (born 1929), who became professor at the university of Vienna and also worked as a legal advisor at the Austrian Foreign Ministry; Herbert Miehsler (1934–1986), who became professor at the Karl-Franzens University of Graz and Paris Lodron University of Salzburg; and Bruno Simma (born in 1941), who met Verdross in 1967, when he was already emeritus, and became professor at the University of Michigan Law School and at the Ludwig-Maximilians-Universität München, and served as a judge on the International Court of Justice.

Alongside his academic capacity, Verdross contributed to the development of international law as a judge at the European Court of Human Rights in the early stages of this new system of international rights protection, and as a member of the International Law Commission. Thanks to his long membership of the International Law Commission, he was in a position to contribute his ideas to the international codification process.

== Awards ==
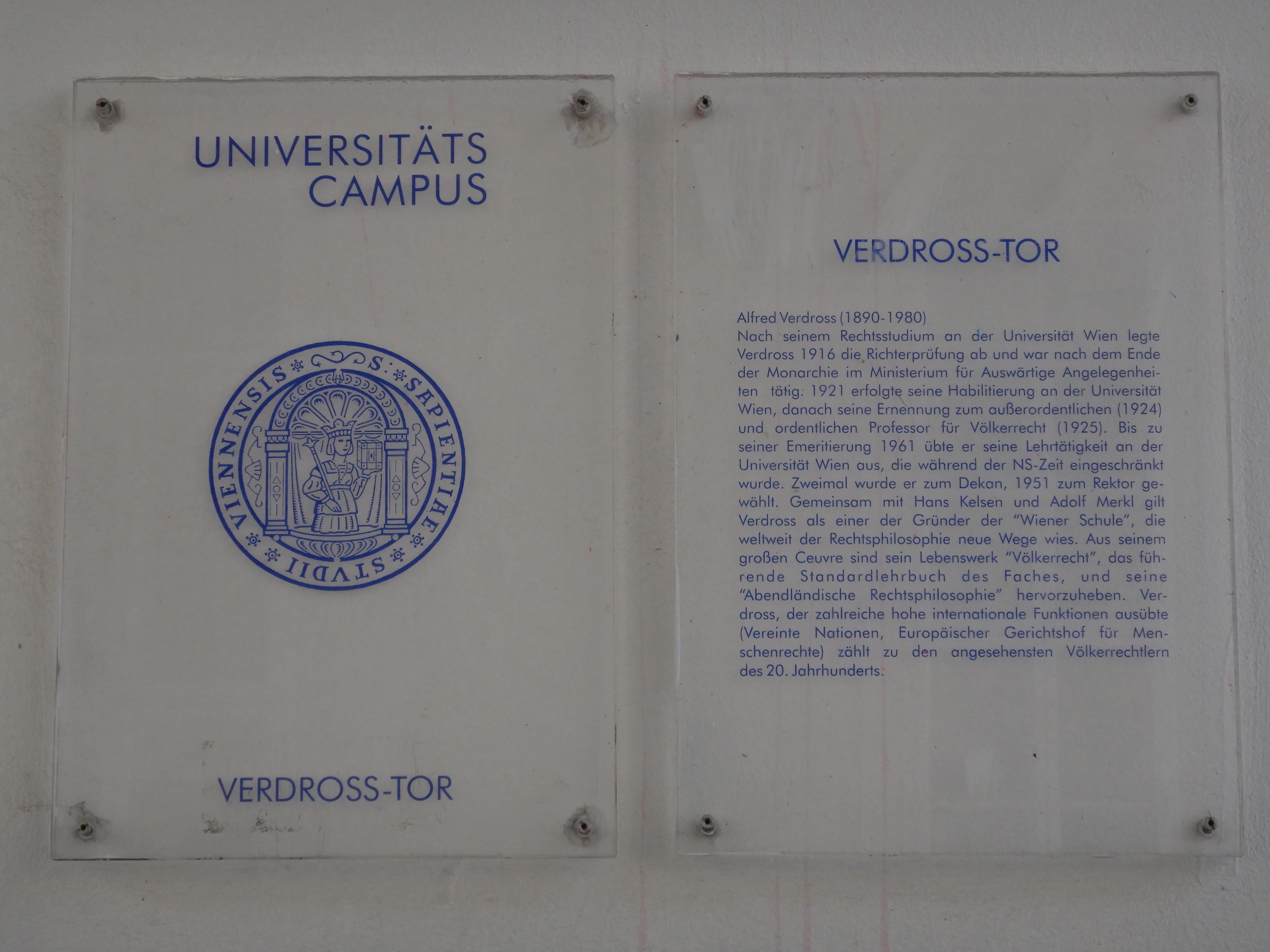
Memorial plaque for Alfred Verdross, University of Vienna, Alser Straße 4

- Honorary doctorates of the universities of Paris, Salamanca, Frankfurt, Thessaloniki.
- Doctor theologiae honoris causa at the University of Vienna.
- Doctor philosophiae honoris causa at the University of Salzburg (1967).
- Member (since 1928) of the Institut de droit international; Honorary member (from 1977); President from 1959 to 1961.
- Full member of the Austrian Academy of Sciences (from 1950).
- Honorary member of the American Society of International Law (1953).
- Grand Decoration of Honour for Services to the Republic of Austria in Silver (1954).
- Knight Commander of the Pontifical Order of St. Gregory the Great (1958).
- Austrian Decoration of Honour for Science and Art (1959).
- Honorary senator of the University of Vienna (1960).
- Ring of Honour of the City of Vienna (1960).
- Prize of the City of Vienna for the Humanities (1967).
- Nomination for the Nobel Peace Prize (1969, 1970).
- Foreign Member of the Italian Accademia dei Lincei (1971).
- Kardinal Innitzer Prize, Archdiocese of Vienna (1974).
- Feltrinelli Prize, Accademia dei Lincei (1975).
- Spanish Grand Cross of the Civil Order of Alfonso X, the Wise. (1977)
- Grand Decoration of Honour for Services to the Republic of Austria in Gold with Star (1980).
- Dedication in his name of one of the "Gates of Remembrance" at the campus of the University of Vienna and memorial plaque (1998).

== Publications (selected) ==
=== Books ===
- Die Einheit des rechtlichen Weltbildes auf Grundlage der Völkerrechtsverfassung (Tübingen, Mohr 1923)
- Die Verfassung der Völkerrechtsgemeischaft (Wien, Springer 1926)
- Völkerrecht (Berlin, Springer, 1937 read online; 5th ed. 1964, with Stephan Verosta and Karl Zemanek)
- Die immerwährende Neutralität der Republik Österreich (Wien, Österreichischer Bundesverlag, 1958; 3rd ed. 1967)
- Abendländische Rechtsphilosophie. Ihre Grundlagen und Hauptprobleme in geschichtlicher Schau (Wien, Springer, 1958; 2nd ed. 1963)
- Die Quellen des Universellen Völkerrechts. Eine Einführung (Freiburg, Rombach, 1973)
- (with Bruno Simma) Universelles Völkerrechts. Theorie und Praxis (Berlin, Duncker & Humblot, 1976; 3rd ed. 1984)
- Österreichs immerwährende Neutralität (Wien, Verlag f. Politik u. Geschichte, 1978; also in English and French).
- Alfred Verdross: Gesammelte Schriften, edited by Franz Köck and Herbert Schambeck (Wien, Verlag Österreich, 2019) ISBN 978-3-7046-8267-3

=== Courses ===
- "Le fondement du droit international" (1927-I) 16 Recueil des cours de l'Académie de droit international, pp. 247–323. read online
- "Règles générales du droit international de la paix" (1929-V) 30 Recueil des cours de l'Académie de droit international, pp. 271–518. read online
- "Les règles internationales concernant le traitement des étrangers" (1931-III) 37 Recueil des cours de l'Académie de droit international, pp. 323–412. read online
- "Les principes généraux du droit dans la jurisprudence internationale" (1935-II) 52 Recueil des cours de l'Académie de droit international, pp. 191–251. read online
- "Idées directrices de l'Organisation des Nations Unies" (1953) 83 Recueil des cours de l'Académie de droit international, pp. 1–78.

=== Essays ===
- "Das Problem des freien Ermessens und die Freirechtsbewegung", Österreichische Zeitschrift für öffentliches Recht, 1. Jahrgang, Wien 1914, pp. 616–644. read online
- "L'excès de pouvoir du juge arbitral dans le droit international public", Revue de droit international et de législation comparée, 1928, pp. 225–242. read online
- "Les principes généraux du droit et le droit des gens", Revue de droit international, 1934, pp. 484. read online
- "L'idée du droit des gens dans la philosophie de Platon à Hegel", Mélanges offerts à Ernest Mahaim, vol. II, 1935, p. 383.
- "Forbidden Treaties in International Law", American Journal of International Law, 1937, pp. 571–577. read online
- "General International Law and The United Nations Charter", International Affairs, 1954, pp. 342–348. read online
- "Jus Dispositivum and Jus Cogens in International Law", American Journal of International Law, 1966, pp. 55–63. read online
- "Le principe de la non intervention dans les affaires relevant de la compétence nationale d'un Etat et l'article 2 (7) de la Charte des Nations Unies", in La Communauté internationale. Mélanges offerts à Charles Rousseau, Paris, Pedone, 1974, pp. 267–276. read online
- "La dignité de la personne humaine comme base des droits de l’homme", Österreichische Zeitschrift für öffentliches Recht und Völkerrecht, 1980, vol. 31, pp. 271–277.

=== Festschriften ===
- F. A. von der Heydte et al. (eds.), Völkerrecht und rechtliches Weltbild. Festschrift für Alfred Verdross (Vienna: Springer, 1960).
- R. Marcic et al. (eds.), Internationale Festschrift für Alfred Verdross zum 80. Geburtstag (München-Salzburg: Wilhelm Fink Verlag, 1971)
- H. Miehsler et al. (eds.), Ius Humanitatis. Festschrift zum 90. Geburtstag von Alfred Verdross (Berlin: Duncker & Humblot, 1980) ISBN 978-3-428-04593-8.

== See also ==
- Hans Kelsen
- Hugo Krabbe
- Monism and dualism in international law
- Neo-scholasticism
- Axiological ethics
- Pan-Germanism
- Peremptory norm
- School of Salamanca
- Othmar Spann
- Friedrich August Freiherr von der Heydte

== Notes and references ==
=== References ===
- Académie de droit international de La Haye (1935). "Notice biographique" [Biographical note]. Recueil des cours de l'Académie de droit international de la Haye (in French). 52 (II). Paris: Recueil Sirey: 193. Archived from the original on 18 May 2023.
- Amorosa, Paolo (2022). "A world safe for Catholicism: interwar international law and Neo-Scholastic universalism". History of European Ideas. 49 (2): 411–427. doi:10.1080/01916599.2022.2073682. hdl:10138/358339. ISSN 0191-6599. S2CID 248956309. Archived from the original on 13 May 2023.
- Bernstorff, Jochen von (2010). The public international law theory of Hans Kelsen: Believing in universal law. Cambridge: Cambridge University Press. ISBN 978-0-511-77646-5. OCLC 701051530. Archived from the original on 26 February 2023.
- Bogdandy, Armin von; Venzke, Ingo (2014). In Whose Name? A Public Law Theory of International Adjudication. Oxford New York, NY: Oxford University Press. ISBN 978-0-19-871746-1.
- Busch, Jürgen (2012). "Ein Mann des Widerspruchs? Teil 1. Verdross im Gefüge der Wiener Völkerrechtswissenschaft vor und nach 1938" [A Man of contradiction? Part 1. Verdross in the structure of Viennese international law scholarship before and after 1938]. In Meissel, Franz-Stefan; Reiter-Zatloukal, Ilse; Schima, Stefan (eds.). Vertriebenes Recht – Vertreibendes Recht. Zur Geschichte der Wiener Rechts- und Staatswissenschaftlichen Fakultät zwischen 1938 und 1945 (in German). Wien: Manz. ISBN 978-3-214-07405-0.
- Carty, Anthony (1995). "Alfred Verdross and Othmar Spann: German Romantic Nationalism, National Socialism and International Law" (PDF). European Journal of International Law. 6 (1). Oxford University Press: 78–97. doi:10.1093/ejil/6.1.78. ISSN 0938-5428. Archived (PDF) from the original on 26 July 2011.
- Fillafer, Franz Leander; Feichtinger, Johannes (2019). "Natural Law and the Vienna School: Hans Kelsen, Alfred Verdross, and Eric Voegelin". In Langford, Peter; Bryan, Ian; McGarry, John (eds.). Hans Kelsen and the natural law tradition. Leiden and Boston: Brill. pp. 425–461. doi:10.1163/9789004390393_014. ISBN 978-90-04-39039-3. OCLC 1085621405. S2CID 201402010.
- García-Salmones Rovira, Mónica (2013). The Project of Positivism in International Law. Oxford University Press. doi:10.1093/acprof:oso/9780199685202.001.0001. ISBN 978-0-19-968520-2. Archived from the original on 13 May 2023.
- Gragl, Paul (2018). Legal monism: Law, philosophy, and politics. Oxford: Oxford University Press. ISBN 978-0-19-251606-0. OCLC 1029323752. Archived from the original on 26 February 2023.
- Kelsen, Hans (1967) [1960]. Pure Theory of Law. Translated by Knight, Max (2 ed.). Berkeley: University of California Press.
- Kniefacz, Katharina; Mühlberger, Kurt (2014). "Alfred Verdroß-Droßberg, o. Univ.-Prof. Dr. jur., Dr. h.c. mult". 650 Plus (in German). University of Vienna. Archived from the original on 12 March 2023.
- Koeck, Heribert Franz (2021). "The 'Austrian School of International Law': The Influence of Austrian International Lawyers on the Formation of the Present International Legal Order". European International Law Traditions. Cham: Springer International Publishing. pp. 61–95. doi:10.1007/978-3-030-52028-1_3. ISBN 978-3-030-52027-4. S2CID 229385766. Archived from the original on 11 May 2023.
- Koskenniemi, Martti (2011). "Between Coordination and Constitution: International Law as a German Discipline". Redescriptions: Political Thought, Conceptual History and Feminist Theory. 15 (1). Helsinki University Press: 45–70. doi:10.7227/r.15.1.4. ISSN 2308-0914.
- Laval, Pierre-François (n.d.). "Alfred Verdross (1890–1980)". Société française pour le droit international. Galerie des internationalistes francophones (in French). Archived from the original on 2 March 2023.
- Lingens, Karl-Heinz (2001). "Verdroß, Alfred". In Stolleis, Michael (ed.). Juristen. Eine biographisches Lexikon [Jurists. A biographical encyclopaedia] (in German). C.H. Beck. pp. 649–650. ISBN 3406-45957-9.
- Mannoni, Stefano (1999). Potenza e ragione. La scienza del diritto internazionale nella crisi dell'equilibrio europeo (1870–1914) [Power and reason. The science of international law in the crisis of the European equilibrium (1870-1914)]. Per la storia del pensiero giuridico moderno (in Italian). Vol. 54. Milano: Giuffré. ISBN 88-14-07768-1.
- Navari, Cornelia (2021). "The Recovery of Vitoria and Suarez, and the Apprehension of a World Society: Krabbe, Verdross and Leon Duguit". The International Society Tradition. Palgrave Studies in International Relations. Palgrave Macmillan. pp. 105–119. doi:10.1007/978-3-030-77018-1_8. ISBN 978-3-030-77017-4. S2CID 238940448. Archived from the original on 26 February 2023.
- Raz, Joseph (1979). "Kelsen's Theory of The Basic Norm". The authority of law: Essays on law and morality. Oxford University Press. pp. 122–145. doi:10.1093/acprof:oso/9780198253457.003.0007. ISBN 9780198253457.
- Seidl-Hohenveldern, Ignaz (1995). "Recollections of Alfred Verdross" (PDF). European Journal of International Law. 6 (1). Oxford University Press (OUP): 98–102. doi:10.1093/ejil/6.1.98. ISSN 0938-5428. Archived (PDF) from the original on 16 June 2022.
- Simma, Bruno (1975). "Alfred Verdross – 85 Years Old". American Journal of International Law. 69 (2): 134–135. doi:10.1017/S0002930000189079. S2CID 152007579. Archived from the original on 14 March 2023.
- Simma, Bruno (1995a). "Alfred Verdross (1890–1980): Biographical Note with Bibliography" (PDF). European Journal of International Law. 6 (1). Oxford University Press: 103–115. doi:10.1093/ejil/6.1.103. ISSN 0938-5428. Archived (PDF) from the original on 16 April 2015.
- Simma, Bruno (1995b). "The Contribution of Alfred Verdross to the Theory of International Law" (PDF). European Journal of International Law. 6 (1). Oxford University Press: 33–54. doi:10.1093/ejil/6.1.33. ISSN 0938-5428. Archived (PDF) from the original on 23 March 2022.
- Simma, Bruno (2018). "Alfred Verdross (1890–1980)". In Kilian, Michael; Wolff, Heinrich Amadeus; Häberle, Peter (eds.). Staatsrechtslehrer des 20. Jahrhunderts: Deutschland – Österreich – Schweiz [Constitutional Law Scholars of the 20th Century: Germany - Austria - Switzerland] (in German). Berlin, Boston: De Gruyter. pp. 417–430. doi:10.1515/9783110546682-024. ISBN 9783110546682. S2CID 240387895. Archived from the original on 11 May 2023.
- Sinclair, I. M. (1970). "Vienna Conference on the Law of Treaties". The International and Comparative Law Quarterly. 19 (1). Cambridge University Press: 47–69. doi:10.1093/iclqaj/19.1.47. ISSN 1471-6895. JSTOR 758305. Archived from the original on 11 May 2023.
- Staudigl-Ciechowicz, Kamila; Olechowski, Thomas (2014). "Völkerrecht" [International Law]. Die Wiener Rechts- und Staatswissenschaftliche Fakultät 1918–1938 (in German). Göttingen: V&R Unipress. pp. 521–547. doi:10.14220/9783737097994.521. ISBN 978-3-89971-985-7. Archived from the original on 11 May 2023.
- Stolleis, Michael (2004). A history of public law in Germany, 1914–1945. Oxford: Oxford University Press. ISBN 0-19-926936-X. OCLC 53392590. Archived from the original on 11 May 2023.
- Verdross, Alfred (1928). "Le fondement du droit international" [The foundation of international law]. Recueil des cours de l'Académie de droit international de la Haye (in French). 16 (1927-I). Paris: Librairie Hachette: 247–323. Archived from the original on 13 March 2023.
- Verdross, Alfred (1937). Völkerrecht [International Law] (in German). Berlin: Springer.
