= Laband =

Laband is a surname. Notable people with the surname include:

- Felix Laband (born in 1977), South African electronic music artist
- Fritz Laband (1925–1982), German footballer
- John Laband (1947–2025), South African historian and writer
- Paul Laband (1838–1918), German jurist

== See also ==
- Labant
- Zimmermann–Laband syndrome, also known as Laband Zimmermann syndrome, and Laband's Syndrome, is an extremely rare autosomal dominant congenital disorder
