= Paul Laband =

German scholar of constitutional law (1838–1918)

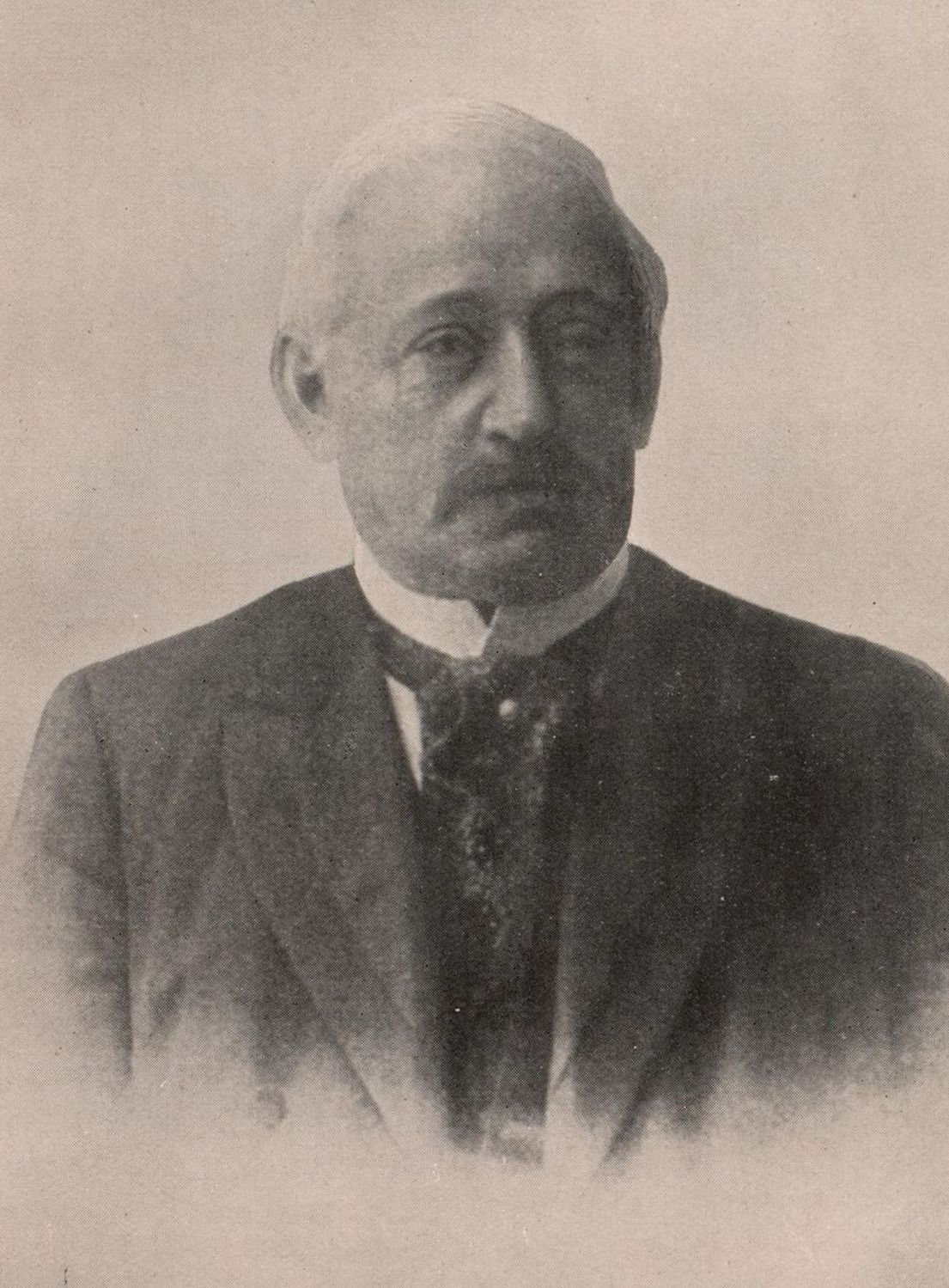
- Paul Laband
- Born: 24 May 1838; Breslau, Province of Silesia, Kingdom of Prussia
- Died: 23 March 1918 (aged 79); Strasbourg, Alsace-Lorraine, German Empire
- Occupation: Jurist
- Years active: Late 19th–early 20th century
- Known for: Leading authority on German public law and legal positivism

Academic background
- Education: University of Breslau; Heidelberg University; Humboldt University of Berlin
- Alma mater: Heidelberg University
- Thesis: (1858)
- Influences: Carl Friedrich von Gerber

Academic work
- Discipline: Public law
- Sub-discipline: German constitutional law; Budget and financial law
- School or tradition: Legal positivism
- Institutions: University of Königsberg; University of Strasbourg
- Main interests: Constitutional law of the German Empire; Budget law; Theory of the state
- Notable works: Das Staatsrecht des Deutschen Reiches (The public law of the German Empire)
- Influenced: Vittorio Emanuele Orlando; Raymond Carré de Malberg

Paul Laband (24 May 1838 – 23 March 1918) was a German jurist widely regarded as the leading authority on public law in the period following the national unification and the establishment of the German Empire in 1871. Building on the work of Carl Friedrich Gerber, who first proposed applying Pandectist methods to public law, Laband refined and expanded upon the formalist orientation that was characteristic of the legal culture of his time. His book Das Staatsrecht des Deutschen Reiches was reprinted five times between 1876 and 1914 and is considered the most influential exposition of German constitutional law of the Wilhelmine era, as well as a paradigmatic statement of late 19th-century legal positivism. According to this view, legal science has a "constructive task" – the development and rationalisation of the legal system – in performing which it must be guided solely by legal logic, without attributing any relevance to "historical, political and philosophical" considerations.

== Biography and Work ==
Laband was born in Breslau into a Jewish family of physicians. (Note: Mussgnug 2015, p. 22, Pauly 1993, p. 305, Schlink 1992, pp. 555–556. Laband converted to Protestantism in 1857, at the age of nineteen, a year before earning his doctorate, a circumstance he avoided mentioning in his Lebenserinnerungen (Memoirs). Bernhard Schlink asks in this regard: Had he forgotten this event? Had his assimilation been so deep and complete that he now knew himself only as an assimilated person and no longer as a person to be assimilated? Or did he not want to touch the subject, did he not want to look at the thin ice on which he, a Jew, moved as a German, as a scholar, as a devoted servant of the Empire and progenitor of German public law? Or did both coexist in mutual tension in the act of removal? On the relationship between Laband's Jewish origins and the critical reading of his work, see the next explanatory note.) He studied at the universities of Breslau, Heidelberg, and Berlin. After earning his doctorate in 1858, at the age of twenty, with a thesis on marital property, he obtained his habilitation for university teaching in Heidelberg in 1861. Early in his academic career, he focused primarily on commercial law and the history of German law, serving as co-editor of the Zeitschrift für das gesamte Handelsrecht from 1864, and publishing the study Die vermögensrechtlichen Klagen nach den sächsischen Rechtsquellen des Mittelalters (Property actions according to the Saxon legal sources of the Middle Ages) of 1869.

In 1866 Laband was appointed to the University of Königsberg, where he began teaching public law. Two years later he became a full professor. His engagement with public law arose largely by chance, prompted by the university's teaching requirements, and was shaped by contemporary political events, including the Prussian constitutional conflict (1859-1866) and the establishment of the North German Confederation in 1867. His debut work in the field, Das Budgetrecht nach den Bestimmungen der preußischen Verfassungsurkunde unter Berücksichtigung der Verfassung des Norddeutschen Bundes (Budget Law According to the Provisions of the Prussian Constitutional Charter in Light of the Constitution of the North German Confederation), published in 1870, was an "unexpected" success. Thereafter, all of Laband's scholarship fell within the scope of public law. The essay is now chiefly remembered for his distinction between law "in the formal sense" and law "in the material sense", a conceptual device that enabled him to justify Otto von Bismarck's management of the state budget in the absence of parliamentary approval.

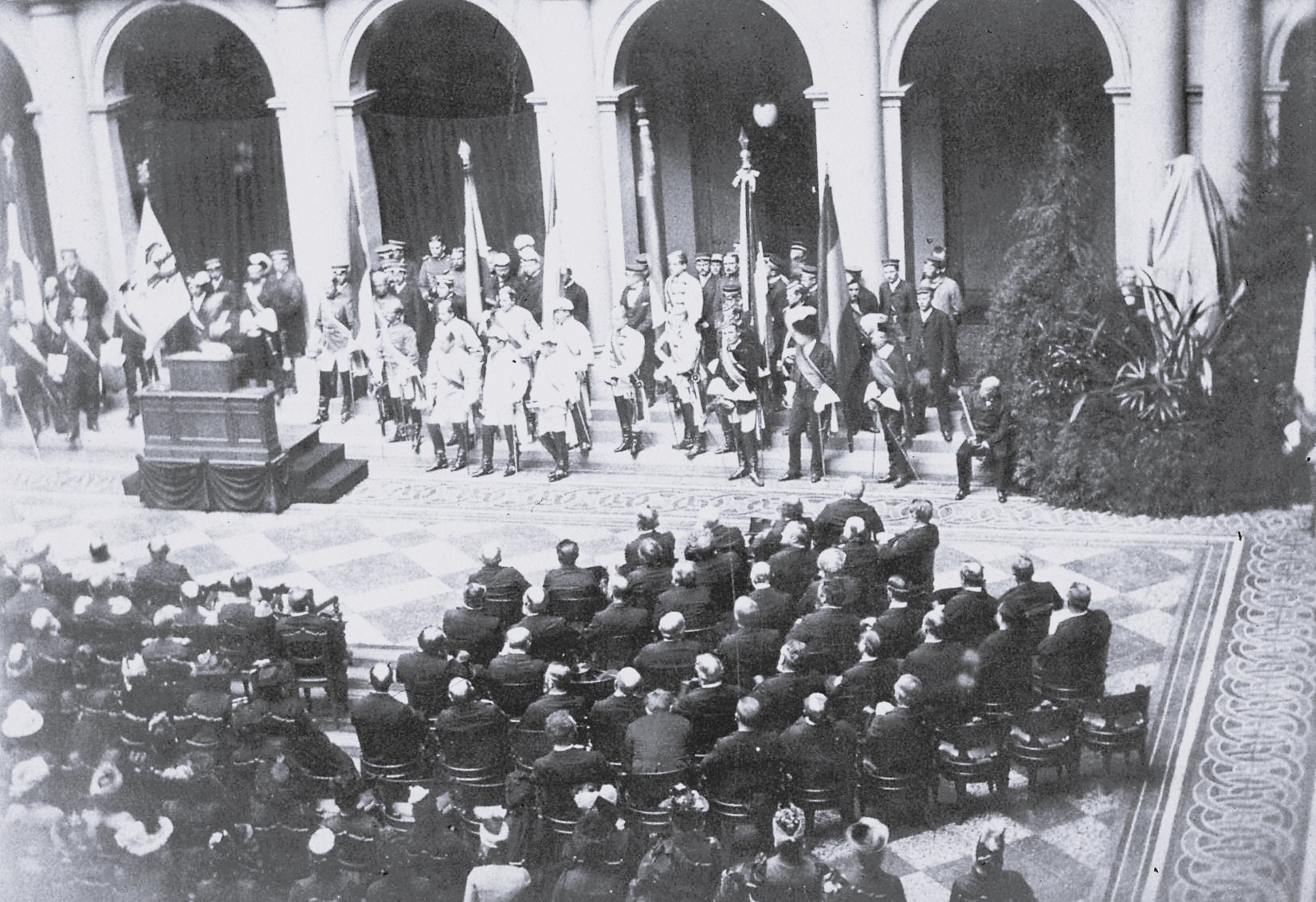
Visit of Emperor Wilhelm I to the University of Strasbourg, 1886. After the annexation of Alsace-Lorraine in 1871, the Emperor and his Chancellor Bismarck wanted to make the newly established "Kaiser-Wilhelms-Universität" in Strasbourg a center for the propagation of German culture.

In 1872 Laband accepted a position at the newly established University of Strasbourg, a cultural institution personally backed by Bismarck and kept under strict government control. Despite his active involvement in the political life of the Empire and repeated offers of ministerial and judicial appointments, he never wished to leave Strasbourg. There he taught constitutional law and held various academic and municipal offices, including serving as rector of the university in 1880 and as a member of the supervisory committee of the municipal music conservatory. He was politically active from 1880 to 1918, serving as a member of the Council of State for Alsace-Lorraine (1880-1911), as a member of the First Chamber of the Parliament of Alsace-Lorraine (from 1911 onwards), and on numerous ministerial commissions. He held these positions by virtue of the prestige he had acquired through his scholarly work, particularly the publication of the first volumes of his most influential work, Das Staatsrecht des Deutschen Reiches (The Public Law of the German Empire).

Published in three volumes between 1876 and 1882 and subjected to five extensive revisions – the final edition appearing in four volumes between 1911 and 1914 – Das Staatsrecht des Deutschen Reiches was hailed as a "monument to imperial pride in the field of public law", the most authoritative exposition of German public law of the Wilhelmine era, and the most complete theorisation of nineteenth-century legislative legal positivism. The work consolidated Laband's "exceptional scientific success", establishing him as the "celebrated leader of the discipline". He came to be recognised as the founder of a renewed science of public law which, from about 1880 until the Weimar Republic, dominated German legal scholarship almost unchallenged. Laband's scholarship exerted a lasting influence on Italian legal culture through Vittorio Emanuele Orlando and on French public law through Raymond Carré de Malberg. As the German jurist Philipp Zorn observed in 1907, "all work on constitutional law after Laband stands on his shoulders".

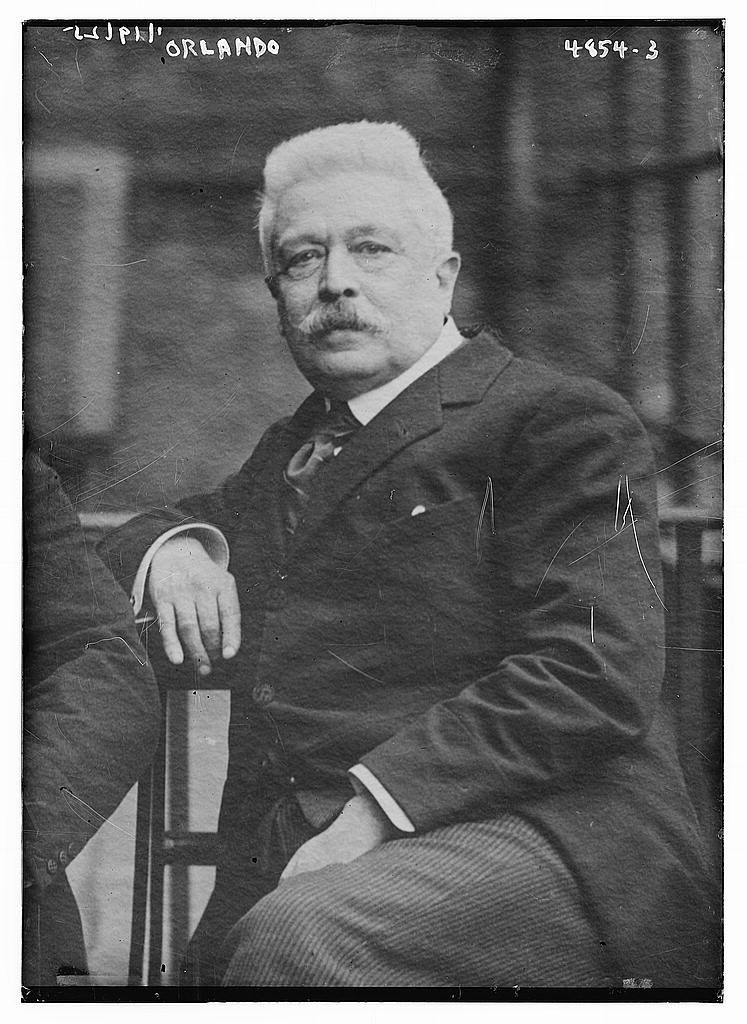
In Italy, Vittorio Emanuele Orlando was the founder of a "national school of public law" that largely adopted the method and teachings of German legal doctrine, including Laband.

Laband was also co-founder of three notable German legal journals: Archiv für öffentliches Recht (1886), Deutsche Juristenzeitung (1896), and Jahrbuch für öffentliches Recht (1907). He received various honorary degrees and orders of merit and was the subject of numerous celebratory writings. Emperor Wilhelm II is said to have publicly expressed regret at being unable to attend Laband's lectures and appointed him to the First Chamber of Parliament "by virtue of the highest trust".

Of conservative political orientation, he was among the signatories of the Manifesto of the Ninety-Three, in which prominent representatives of German culture and science denied Germany's responsibility for the outbreak of the First World War and for the invasion of Belgium (the so-called "Rape of Belgium").

The political presuppositions of Laband's "purely legal" approach have been described as follows:

an awareness of the secure material foundations of bourgeois existence in the new Empire; the unreserved acceptance of the political order created by Bismarck; a lack of sensitivity to substantive issues in positive law; and the conviction that legal reasoning ought, in principle, to concern itself only with the formal side of the law.

== Critique ==
Laband developed the work begun by Carl Friedrich von Gerber in Grundzüge eines Systems des deutschen Staatsrechts (1865): like Gerber, he sought to apply to public law the legal method that Pandectist jurists Georg Friedrich Puchta and Bernhard Windscheid had developed in their study of civil and commercial law. This entailed adopting a "formalist" orientation in public law studies, not merely in the sense of abandoning the theories of natural law, but more broadly in the sense of purifying legal discourse of historical, philosophical, ethical, or political considerations. Such considerations were still common in the Germanist strand of the historical school of law (for example in the work of Otto von Gierke) and among progressive and liberal jurists such as Albert Hänel. For Gerber and Laband, the task was to construct a coherent and complete system of legal concepts, devoid of extra-legal elements, in order to consolidate the "scientific" status of public law and to secure legal certainty against the pressure of partisan political interests.

In concrete terms, this programme of constructing the disciplinary paradigm on "purely legal" foundations led to the removal of themes typical of democratic and liberal constitutionalism, such as the sovereignty of the people, human rights, the doctrine of the social contract, and the separation of powers. To Laband's formalism these concepts appeared inextricably bound up with the ideas of Montesquieu (separation of powers), Rousseau (social contract, equality of citizens, sovereignty of the people), Sieyès (rights of man and citizen, national sovereignty, political representation), the idéologues, the Jacobins, revolutionary natural law, and the French Revolution, which had deployed them in a radical critique of the political institutions of the ancien régime. In Germany, the theme of the "fundamental rights of the German people" evoked the debates of Vormärz liberalism and the Frankfurt Constitution. These concepts were therefore regarded as strictly political and extra-legal, and were replaced by the characteristic notions of a state-centred legal positivism: the sovereignty and personality of the state, the organs of the state, and individual rights conceived as mere reflections of the exercise of state power.

In particular, for Laband rights were not autonomous spheres of personal inviolability that could be asserted against the state, but only the reflection of "rules on the exercise of state authority which the state itself lays down". From a strictly legal point of view, Laband taught, the people does not exist: unlike the state, it has no legal personality and therefore cannot express a legally relevant will. The people thus has no rights and no powers, a circumstance that led Laband to argue that the expression "representation of the people", used with reference to parliament, is misleading. Parliament is only an organ of the state which, like all the others, derives its powers from its place within the state constitution and lacks any autonomous legitimacy. In Laband's work, "legal" and "state" become almost synonymous, to the point that the constitution itself is treated as nothing other than an expression of state sovereignty: all law, for the German jurist, ultimately derives from the will of the state.

The centrality of the sovereignty of the state-person in Laband's construction set his doctrine sharply apart from both liberal constitutionalism and from the organicist orientations of the Germanist school, which sought to explore the relationship between society and state, or between community and institutions. Historiography has interpreted this limited engagement with the social dimension as evidence of Laband's "rigid dogmatism", a retreat of the "legal method" into the defence of the status quo, and of a loss of the intellectual ambition and relative independence from political power that the historical school had still claimed. On this reading, legal scholarship was gradually reduced to a mere technical instrument of the apparatuses of power. Even jurists of the generation after Laband, in particular Rudolf Smend, reproached him for a lack of "political sense", for "empty formalism" and for "rootlessness", thereby anticipating, in some respects, the later claim of an intrinsic link between Judaism, on the one hand, and formalism, intellectualism, and insensitivity to the values of the organic community, on the other. This opposition was later taken up by the virulently antisemitic legal literature of Nazism, which attacked the "degenerate legal positivism" of jurists of Jewish origin such as Paul Laband and Hans Kelsen. (Note: Stolleis 2014, pp. 508–509. Several of the most important German and Austrian jurists of the nineteenth and twentieth centuries were of Jewish origin: besides Laband, this was the case for Friedrich Julius Stahl, Levin Goldschmidt, Georg Jellinek, Hermann Heller, Erich Kaufmann, Hans Kelsen and others. On the relationship between National Socialism and Jewish legal culture, see Hugo Sinzheimer (1953) [1938]. Jüdische Klassiker der deutschen Rechtswissenschaft (in German). Frankfurt am Main: Klostermann; Helmut Heinrichs; Harald Franzki; et al., eds. (1993). Deutsche Juristen jüdischer Herkunft (in German). Munich: Beck; and, on Laband in particular, Pauly 1993. The expression "degenerate positivism" was implicitly directed at Paul Laband and Georg Jellinek by the Nazi "Crown jurist" Carl Schmitt, who portrayed pre-Nazi German public-law scholarship as a "degenerate positivism" that clung to "the normative power of the factual" rather than to "a genuine decision;" "The concept of sovereignty in the theory of the state by Laband and Jellinek and the theory of the 'sole supremacy of the state' make the state an abstract person so to speak, a unicum sui generis, with a monopoly of power 'mystically produced'." See Schmitt, Carl (2005) [1934]. Political Theology: Four Chapters on the Concept of Sovereignty (PDF). Chicago: University of Chicago Press. pp. 4 and 39. ISBN 0-226-73889-2. Two years later, Schmitt was among the organisers of the 1936 conference Die deutsche Rechtswissenschaft im Kampf gegen den jüdischen Geist (German legal science in the struggle against the Jewish spirit), which promoted the practice, widely followed during the Nazi period, of marking citations of authors of Jewish origin with the label "the Jew". For an example, see Ernst Anrich; Johannes Stein, eds. (1941). Zur Geschichte der deutschen Universität Strassburg (in German). Strasbourg: Hünenburg-Verlag. p. 128: "In the Faculty of Law the Jew Laband soon gained the upper hand; he separated constitutional law from any connection with the political and spiritual forces that formed it and analysed it logically as a purely positivist fact.") On the other hand, commentators have also emphasised the positive qualities of Laband's work. First, its stylistic merits, which have led to it being described as a "literary masterpiece", admired for "the power of its concepts and the skilful use of language". In addition, scholars have identified some realistic elements in Laband's work, which complicate the stereotypical image of an abstract, history- and politics-blind formalism. Laband, for example, came close to the idea of a constitutional law that was not only written but also based on custom, and many contemporaries regarded him as the first to draw attention to what Georg Jellinek would later call the "normative force of the factual", that is, the need to consider not only for formally enacted rules but also those that were actually followed in practice or enforced by the authorities. Finally, it has been noted that constitutional law in Laband's time differed profoundly from that of the second half of the twentieth century: since the constitution of the German Empire recognised neither fundamental rights nor constitutional adjudication, constitutional law rarely confronted scholars with practical problems of interpretation, allowing them largely to confine themselves to the systematic construction of the subject for textbook purposes. Only after the collapse of the monarchical state, in the turbulent years of the Weimar Republic, did German public-law scholarship move away from the formalism of Laband and his school.

== Works ==
=== Das Staatsrecht des Deutschen Reiches ===
The first edition of Das Staatsrecht des Deutschen Reiches was published in three volumes (the third divided into two parts) between 1876 and 1882.

- Das Staatsrecht des Deutschen Reiches (in German). Vol. 1. Tübingen: Laupp. 1876.
- Das Staatsrecht des Deutschen Reiches (in German). Vol. 2. Tübingen: Laupp. 1878.
- Das Staatsrecht des Deutschen Reiches (in German). Vol. 3, part 1. Tübingen: Laupp. 1880.
- Das Staatsrecht des Deutschen Reiches (in German). Vol. 3, part 2. Freiburg/Tübingen: Mohr. 1882.

From the fourth edition (1901) onward the material was reorganised into four volumes. The fifth and final edition (1911-1914) was reprinted in 1964 (Scientia, Aalen) and 1997 (Keip, Goldbach).

The fifth edition was translated into Italian by Manfredi Siotto Pintor for the "Biblioteca di scienze politiche ed amministrative", edited by Attilio Brunialti, Oreste Ranelletti and Giulio Cesare Buzzati:

- Il diritto pubblico dell'Impero germanico [The Public Law of the German Empire] (5 vols.) (in Italian). Turin: UTET. 1914–1925.

A French translation of the 3rd edition, "revised and updated by the author with the most recent legislation", was published in six volumes between 1900 and 1904, with a preface by Ferdinand Larnaude:

- Le droit public de l'Empire allemand (6 vols.) (in French). Paris: V. Giard et E. Brière. 1900–1904: tome I (1900), tome II (1901), tome III (1902), tome IV (1903), tome V (1903), tome VI (1904).

Beginning in 1894, Laband published in the series Das öffentliche Recht der Gegenwart, issued in Tübingen by J. C. B. Mohr (Paul Siebeck), an abridged version of his major work under the title Deutsches Reichsstaatsrecht. This too was repeatedly revised and reprinted up to the sixth edition of 1912, followed by a posthumous seventh edition updated by Otto Mayer

- Deutsches Reichsstaatsrecht (in German) (7th ed., revised posthumously by Otto Mayer ed.). Aalen: Scientia Verlag. 1969 [1919].

=== Other works (selected) ===
- Die vermögensrechtlichen Klagen nach den Sächsischen Rechtsquellen des Mittelalters [Property Actions According to the Saxon Legal Sources of the Middle Ages] (in German). Königsberg: Hübner & Matz. 1869 (reprinted Aalen, Scientia, 1970, ISBN 3-511-00285-0.
- "Das Budgetrecht nach den Bestimmungen der preußischen Verfassungsurkunde unter Berücksichtigung der Verfassung des Norddeutschen Bundes" [Budget Law According to the Provisions of the Prussian Constitutional Charter in Light of the Constitution of the North German Confederation]. Zeitschrift für Gesetzgebung und Rechtspflege in Preußen (in German). IV: 619–707. 1870 (also published as a standalone extract, Berlin: Guttentag, 1871; reprinted Berlin-Boston, De Gruyter, 2020, ISBN 978-3-11-170520-0).
- "Das Budgetrecht nach den Bestimmungen der preußischen Verfassungsurkunde unter Berücksichtigung der Verfassung des Norddeutschen Bundes" [Budget Law According to the Provisions of the Prussian Constitutional Charter in Light of the Constitution of the North German Confederation]. Zeitschrift für Gesetzgebung und Rechtspflege in Preußen (in German). IV: 619–707. 1870, issued separately as a standalone extract (Berlin: Guttentag, 1871; reprinted Berlin–Boston: De Gruyter, 2020, ISBN 978-3-11-170520-0; Italian translation: C. Forte, ed. (2007). Il diritto del bilancio (in Italian). Milan: Giuffrè. ISBN 9788814131004).
- "Das Finanzrecht des Deutschen Reiches" [The Financial Law of the German Empire]. Annalen des Deutschen Reiches für Gesetzgebung, Verwaltung und Statistik (in German). VI: 405–565. 1873.
- "Der Begriff der Sonderrechte nach deutschem Reichsrecht" [The Concept of Special Rights under German Imperial Law]. Annalen des Deutschen Reiches für Gesetzgebung, Verwaltung und Statistik (in German). VII: 1487–1524. 1874.
- Deutsches Reichsstaatsrecht (in German). Tübingen: Mohr. 1894 (6th ed. 1912).
- Lebenserinnerungen, Abhandlungen, Beiträge und Reden (1866-1918) [Memoirs, Treatises, Essays and Speeches (1866-1918)] (in German). Leipzig: Zentralantiquariat der DDR. 1980.
- Bernd Schlüter, ed. (2004). Staatsrechtliche Vorlesungen (1872-1918) [Lectures on Constitutional Law (1872-1918)] (in German). Berlin: Duncker & Humblot. ISBN 978-3-428-11219-7.

== Bibliography ==
- Costa, Pietro (2002). "Lo Stato di diritto: un'introduzione storica". In Costa, Pietro; Zolo, Danilo (eds.). Lo Stato di diritto. Storia, teoria, critica (in Italian). Milan: Feltrinelli. pp. 89–170. ISBN 9788807103230.
- Fioravanti, Maurizio (1979). Giuristi e costituzione politica nell'Ottocento tedesco (PDF). Biblioteca per la storia del pensiero giuridico moderno (in Italian). Vol. 8. Milan: Giuffrè. Archived from the original (PDF) on 2 February 2023.
- Friedrich, Manfred (1986). "Paul Laband und die Staatsrechtswissenschaft seiner Zeit". Archiv des öffentlichen Rechts (in German). 111 (2): 197–218. JSTOR 44306420.
- Friedrich, Manfred (1982). "Laband, Paul". Neue Deutsche Biographie (in German). Vol. 13. Berlin: Historische Kommission bei der Bayerischen Akademie der Wissenschaften (HiKo) and Bayerische Staatsbibliothek (BSB).
- Kleinheyer, Gerd; Schröder, Jan (2017). Deutsche und europäische Juristen aus neun Jahrhunderten: eine biographische Einführung in die Geschichte der Rechtswissenschaft (in German) (6th ed.). Tübingen: Mohr Siebeck. pp. 261–263. ISBN 978-3-8252-4526-9. OCLC 965633274.
- Korioth, Stefan (2000). "The Shattering of Methods in Late Wilhelmine Germany. Introduction". In Jacobson, Arthur J.; Schlink, Bernhard (eds.). Weimar: A Jurisprudence of Crisis. University of California Press. pp. 41–50. ISBN 0-520-22059-5.
- Mussgnug, Reinhard (2015). "Paul Laband (1838-1918)". In Häberle, Peter; Kilian, Michael; Wolff, Heinrich Amadeus (eds.). Staatsrechtslehrer des 20. Jahrhunderts (in German). De Gruyter. pp. 21–46. doi:10.1515/9783110546682-002. ISBN 978-3-11-054668-2.
- Pauly, Walter (1993). "Paul Laband (1838-1918). Staatsrechtslehre als Wissenschaft". In Heinrichs, Helmut (ed.). Deutsche Juristen jüdischer Herkunft (in German). Munich: Beck. pp. 301–319.
- Schlink, Bernhard (1992). "Laband als Politiker". Der Staat (in German). 31 (4): 553–569. JSTOR 43643149.
- Stolleis, Michael, ed. (2001) [1995]. "Laband, Paul (1838-1918)". Juristen. Ein biographisches Lexikon (in German). Munich: C. H. Beck. pp. 374–375. ISBN 3406459579.
- Stolleis, Michael (2014) [1992]. Storia del diritto pubblico in Germania. Vol. II: Dottrina del diritto pubblico e scienza dell'amministrazione 1800-1914 (in Italian). Translated by Rocca, Cristina; Pietropaoli, Stefano. Milan: Giuffrè.
- Zanobini, Guido (1933). "Laband, Paul". Enciclopedia Italiana (in Italian).
