= Labant =

Labant is a surname. Notable people with the surname include:

- Branislav Labant (born 1976), Slovak footballer
- Vladimír Labant (born 1974), Slovak footballer

== See also ==
- Laband
