= Raymond Carré de Malberg =

French jurist (1861–1935)

Raymond Carré de Malberg (1861–1935) was a French jurist and one of France's leading constitutional scholars.

As professor of public law in Caen, Nancy and Strasbourg, Carré de Malberg developed a thorough positivist theory and critique of French constitutional law, influenced by interwar German thought as expressed in the Weimar Constitution.

Although his works, including Contribution à la théorie générale de l'Etat (1920) and La loi, expression de la volonté générale (1931), became much-cited classics in post-war French scholarship, they have found little reception abroad.

== Biography ==
Louis, Antoine, Julien, Raymond Carré was born on November 1, 1861, at 10 p.m., at No. 4 Quai de Paris, on the Grande Île, Strasbourg. He was the son of Louis-Auguste Carré and his wife, Marie-Geneviève, née Thomas. He was the eldest of the couple’s four children. His brother, Félix Carré de Malberg (1866–1949), a law graduate, was a lawyer and later a judge (president of the Civil Court of Belfort and then of the Court of Appeal of Colmar), a Commander of the Legion of Honor, and a member of the Society of Comparative Law. His father, born in 1828 in Sarreguemines, was a commander of the chasseurs à pied and a Knight of the Legion of Honor. He was the nephew of Caroline-Barbe Colchen Carré de Malberg.

He spent much of his childhood in Strasbourg. In 1870, his father died near Metz during the Franco-Prussian War. Raymond attended the Collège d'Arcueil and later the Collège Stanislas de Paris.

By decree of June 23, 1875, Raymond Carré was granted permission to change his name to Carré de Malberg.

On December 15, 1887, he defended his dissertation on the history of the exception in Roman law and in ancient French procedure. He practiced law in Paris. On May 13, 1890, he ranked first in the law faculty certification exam. Of the six teaching positions available, he chose the one in Caen. There, as a lecturer, he taught private international law and, beginning in 1891, public international law. He published his first case law notes in the Pandectes. On July 31, 1894, he was assigned to the law faculty in Nancy. On April 25, 1896, he was appointed professor by decree. He subsequently taught in Strasbourg.

== Bibliography ==
- Pfersmann, Otto (2001). "Raymond Carré de Malberg". In Michael Stolleis (ed.). Juristen: ein biographisches Lexikon; von der Antike bis zum 20. Jahrhundert (in German) (2nd ed.). München: Beck. p. 122.
