= Camilla Jellinek =

Austrian women's rights activist and lawyer

Camilla Jellinek (née Wertheim) (born 24 September 1860 in Vienna, died 5 October 1940 in Heidelberg) was an Austrian women's rights activist and lawyer. A large number of the women seeking advice of those days worked as waitresses, which was considered disreputable at the time, and was often seen in the "twilight" of prostitution. This was the occasion for Jellinek to deal intensively with the problem of those women, so in her articles, she tried to draw the public's attention to the poor working conditions and the exploitation of women working as waitresses and with the help of a fundraising and a municipal grant, she finally founded a women's home for waitresses in 1907.
