= Josef Laurenz Kunz =

American jurist and political scientist (1890–1970)

Josef Laurenz Kunz (1 April 1890 – 5 August 1970) was an Austrian American jurist. He was a Professor of International Law at the University of Toledo from 1934 to 1960, after having emigrated from Austria in 1932. Kunz earned his doctorate degree in 1920 from the University of Vienna, where he was a student of Hans Kelsen.

== Life and work ==
He was born on April 1, 1890 in Vienna as the son of a wealthy doctor.

After a year of voluntary service in the Royal Austrian Cavalry (1908–1909), he enrolled in the department of law and political sciences at the University of Vienna (1909–1913). He attended the lectures of Louis Renault and Henri Bergson at the Sorbonnne in Paris. In 1913 he lived in London and attended lectures on international law at University College London. He graduated as juris doctor in 1914 and was conscripted into the Austro-Hungarian army where he served until the end of World War I in 1918. He enrolled again at the University of Vienna and in 1920 obtained a doctorate in political science with a dissertation on "The Problem of the Violation of Belgian Neutrality".

During this time he met Hans Kelsen and embraced his Pure Theory of Law together with cosmopolitanism, aversion to nationalism and a commitment to the development of international law through the League of Nations. These ideas hindered his academic career in Austria and in most German-language universities. He only obtained his Habilitation in 1927 and was never appointed professor in Austria and Germany, although he was invited twice, in 1930 and 1932, to deliver the prestigious Hague Lectures.

From 1932 to 1934 he was a Rockefeller Research Fellow in the United States. Thanks to the auspices of Manley O. Hudson, he obtained a chair in international law at the University of Toledo, which he held until 1960, when he retired. From 1944 onwards he was a member of the editorial committee of the American Journal of International Law. In 1955 he delivered a third series of Hague Lectures. In 1957 he was elected associate of the Institut de Droit International, and in 1969 a full member; due to failing health, he resigned from that prestigious academic institution in 1969, in order to make room for younger scholars.

He was given a doctorate honis causa by the National University of Mexico. Often invited to lecture in Latin American countries, he had an interest in Latin American legal philosophy and often published in Spanish, thus contributing to the spread of Kelsen's theory in both North and South America.

He died in Toledo on August 5, 1970, at the age of 80.

== Literature ==
- Miriam Gassner, Austrian Jurists in US-exile – Jurisprudence as a Door Opener to US Law Schools, in: Journal of Austrian American History 10/1-2 (2026) p. 193-214
