= Georg Jellinek =

German public lawyer (1851–1911)

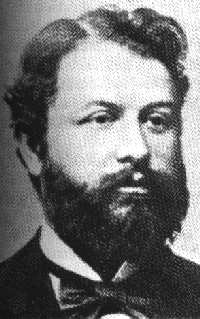
- Georg Jellinek
- Born: 16 June 1851; Leipzig, Saxony, Germany
- Died: 12 January 1911 (aged 59); Heidelberg, Baden, Germany
- Occupation: Jurist

Georg Jellinek (16 June 1851 – 12 January 1911) was a German-Austrian public lawyer and was considered to be "the exponent of public law in Austria".

== Life ==
Jellinek was born in Leipzig. His father, Adolf Jellinek, was an Austrian rabbi.

From 1867, Jellinek studied law, history of art and philosophy at the University of Vienna. He also studied philosophy, history and law in Heidelberg and Leipzig up until 1872. He was the son of Adolf Jellinek, a famous preacher in Vienna's Jewish community. In 1872 he completed his Dr. phil. thesis in Leipzig (The Socio-Ethical Meaning of Justice, Injustice and Punishment) and in 1874 also his Dr. jur. in Vienna.

In 1879 he qualified as a professor at the University of Vienna. Jellinek was later visiting professor of legal philosophy in Vienna, in 1881 he was named a member of the commission for state exams and one year later he published his seminal work, The Theory of the Unifications of States (1882). In 1883 he was given the title of Professor of Public Law at the University of Vienna. In 1889 he was duly given a professorship in Basel and left the academic service of Austria-Hungary. From 1891 he was Ordinarius for general Public Law and International Law at Heidelberg University. In 1900 he compiled his main work, General Theory of the State.

He was married to Camilla Jellinek, née Wertheim (1860–1940), who was persuaded to join the Women's Movement by Marianne Weber in 1900 and became famous there for providing women with legal aid and the production of draft reforms of the criminal law. The couple had six children, born between 1884 and 1896, of which four survived childhood—among them son Walter, who also became a law professor and edited a final, posthumous edition of General Theory of the State; daughter Dora, who survived the Theresienstadt concentration camp; and youngest son, Otto, who died in 1943 as a result of abuse at the hands of the Gestapo.

Jellinek is best known for his essay The Declaration of the Rights of Man and the Citizen (1895), which argues for a universal theory of rights, as opposed to the culturally and nationally specific arguments then in vogue (particularly that of Émile Boutmy). Jellinek argued that the French Revolution, which was the focal point of 19th-century political theory, should not be thought of as arising from a purely French tradition (namely the tradition stemming from Jean-Jacques Rousseau) but as a close analogue of revolutionary movements and ideas in England and the United States.

== Career ==
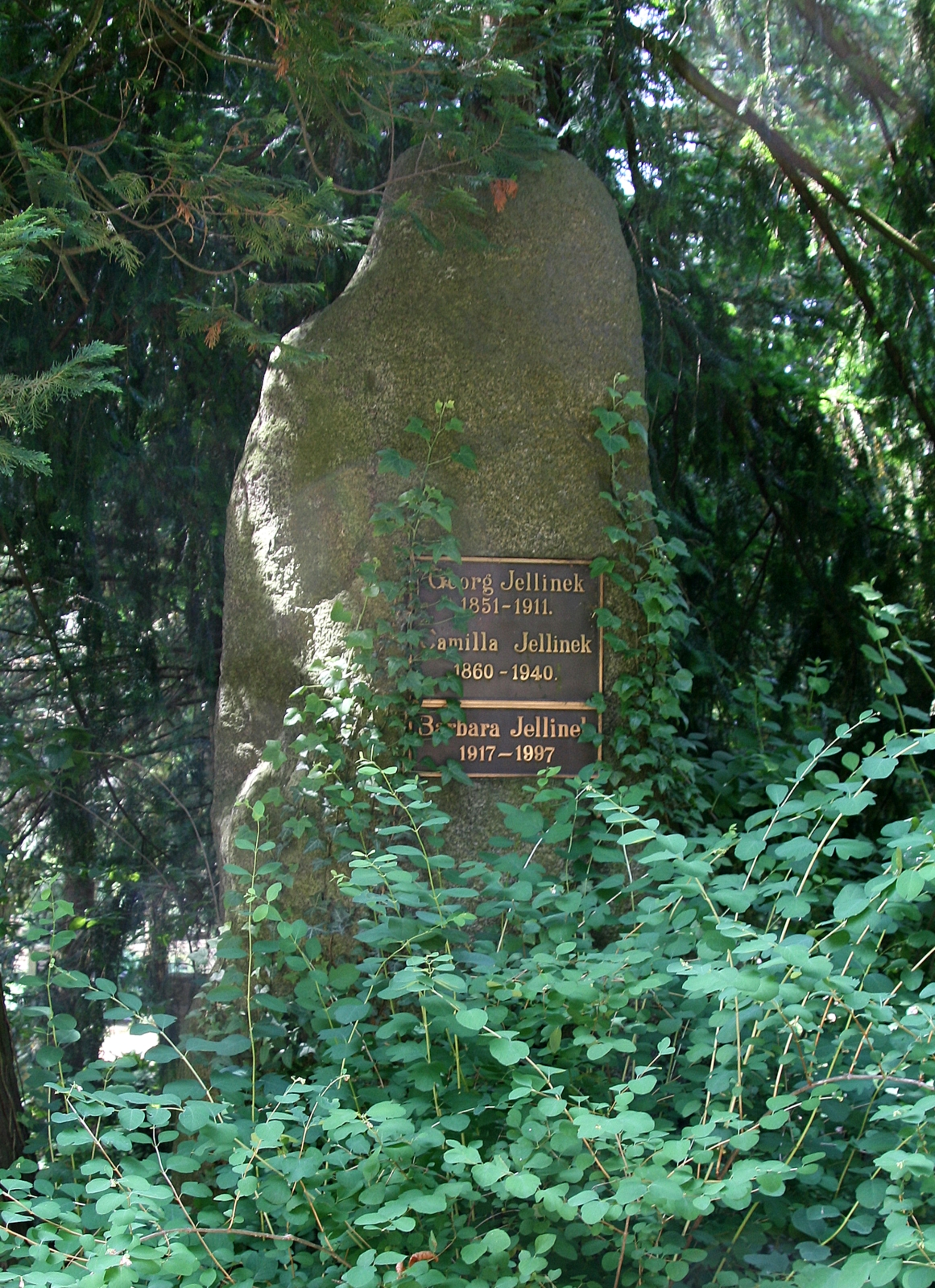
His grave in Heidelberg

Jellinek studied law in 1867 at the University of Vienna along with art history and philosophy. In addition he continued studies until 1872 in philosophy, history and law at Heidelberg University and at the Leipzig University. Jellinek attended Leipzig in 1872 writing a dissertation on The Worldviews of Leibnitz and Schopenhauer and received his Dr. phil. In 1874, he also received the Dr. jur.

In 1879 Jellinek received his habilitation at the University of Vienna. He then became a lecturer for the philosophy of law in Vienna, and in 1881 he was appointed a member of the State Examination Commission. In the following year, Jellinek published one of his seminal works titled The Doctrine of Federated States (1882). In 1883 he was appointed extraordinary professor of constitutional law in Vienna. In 1889 he became a full professor at Basel University, and retired from his academic position in Vienna. In 1891 Jellinek became a professor of law at the Heidelberg University, and in 1900 he wrote his magnum opus, the General Theory of State. In 1907 he became the first Jewish rector of Heidelberg University.

== Theory of the three elements of statehood ==
Georg Jellinek developed the three-element theory, which defines a sovereign state as having three essential characteristics.

1. the people of the state
2. the territory of the state
3. the power of the state, i.e. the exercise of sovereign power within the territory of a state by its organs and institutions, such as the heads of state and government, administration, police, army, parliament and courts.

If one of these characteristics is not present, then according to prevailing doctrine, it is not considered a state. Jellinek's theory is now generally accepted in international law. The Montevideo Convention specifies the ability to enter into relations with other states as an additional criterion.

== Writings ==
The majority of Jellinek's writings remains yet untranslated from the German original.

- Die Weltanschauungen Leibnitz’ und Schopenhauer’s: Ihre Gründe und ihre Berechtigung. Eine Studie über Optimismus und Pessimismus. Vienna: Hölder, 1872 (digital copy).
- Die Lehre von den Staatenverbindungen. Haering, Berlin 1882 (digital copy).
- Die socialethische Bedeutung von Recht, Unrecht und Strafe. Vienna: Hölder, 1878 (digital copy).
- Die rechtliche Natur der Staatenverträge: Ein Beitrag zur juristischen Construction des Völkerrechts. Vienna: Hölder, 1880 (digital copy).
- Österreich-Ungarn und Rumänien in der Donaufrage: Eine völkerrechtliche Untersuchung. Vienna: Hölder, 1884 (digital copy).
- Gesetz und Verordnung: Staatsrechtliche Untersuchungen auf rechtsgeschichtlicher und rechtsvergleichender Grundlage. Freiburg im Breisgau: Mohr, 1887 (digital copy).
- System der subjektiven öffentlichen Rechte. Freiburg im Breisgau: Mohr, 1892 (digital copy).
- Allgemeine Staatslehre (= Recht des modernen Staates. Vol. 1). Berlin, 1900; 2nd edition 1905 (digital copy); 3rd edition 1914 (digital copy).

== Literature ==
- Andreas Anter (Hrsg.): Die normative Kraft des Faktischen: das Staatsverständnis Georg Jellineks. Nomos-Verlag, Baden-Baden 2004, ISBN 3-8329-0733-5.
- Alexander Hollerbach (1974). "Jellinek, Georg". Neue Deutsche Biographie (in German). Vol. 10. Berlin: Duncker & Humblot. pp. 391–392. (full text online).
- Camilla Jellinek: Georg Jellinek. Ein Lebensbild. In: Georg Jellinek, Ausgewählte Schriften und Reden, Bd. 1, Neudruck Aalen 1970, S. 5–140.
- Christian Keller: Victor Ehrenberg und Georg Jellinek. Briefwechsel 1872–1911, Frankfurt am Main 2005, ISBN 978-3-465-03406-3.
- Klaus Kempter: Die Jellineks 1820–1955. Eine familienbiographische Studie zum deutschjüdischen Bildungsbürgertum. Düsseldorf 1998.
- Jens Kersten: Georg Jellinek und die klassische Staatslehre. Verlag Mohr-Siebeck, Tübingen 2000, ISBN 3-16-147348-5.
- Realino Marra: La religione dei diritti. Durkheim – Jellinek – Weber. Giappichelli, Turin 2006, ISBN 88-348-6617-7.
- Stanley L. Paulson (Hrsg.): Georg Jellinek: Beiträge zu Leben und Werk. Verlag Mohr-Siebeck, Tübingen 2000, ISBN 3-16-147377-9.
