= Carl Friedrich von Gerber =

Saxon politician (1823–1891)

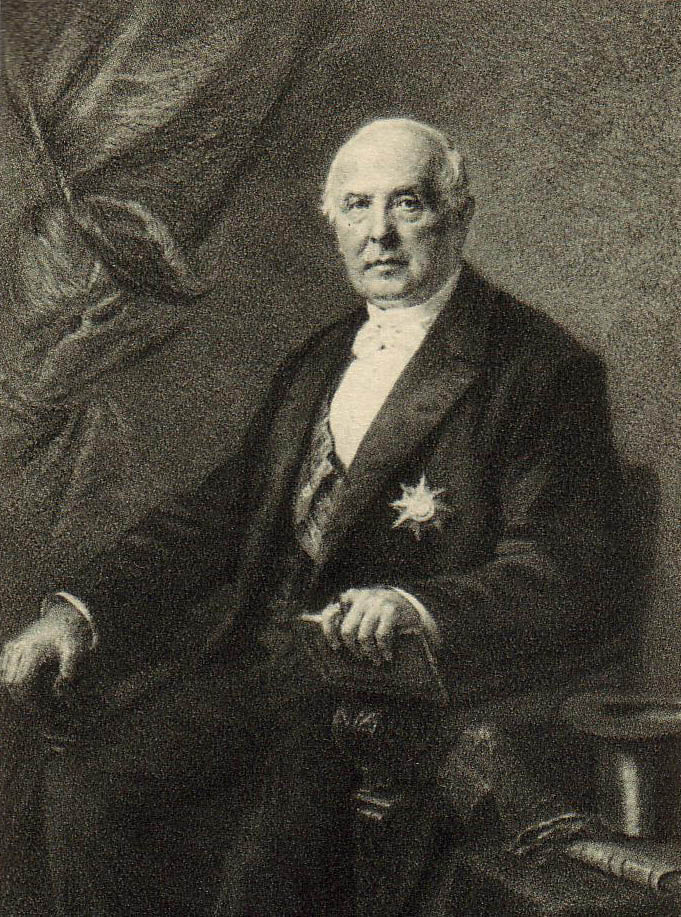
Carl Friedrich von Gerber, at an unknown date

Carl Friedrich Wilhelm Gerber, since 1859 von Gerber (11 April 1823 – 23 December 1891) was a Saxon politician and one of Germany's leading jurists of his time.

Born to a Thuringian family in Ebeleben, Schwarzburg-Sondershausen, Gerber studied law in Jena and taught it in Erlangen after 1847, in Jena in 1862 and in Leipzig after 1863. He is often mentioned as a leading scholar of civil law together with his friend Rudolf von Jhering, and his views also helped shape the development of constitutional law in Germany.

In 1867, he was elected to the North German Reichstag, and became North German minister of culture in 1871. He held that post until in 1891, shortly before his death, he was appointed chief minister of the Saxon government.

Gerber married Rosalie von Bloedau in 1848, with whom he had three children. After her death in 1859, he married her sister Helene von Bloedau, with whom he had two children.
