= Martti Koskenniemi =

Finnish lawyer and former diplomat

- Koskenniemi in 2026.
- Born: Martti Antero Koskenniemi; March 18, 1953 (age 73)
- Title: Emeritus Professor of International Law at the University of Helsinki; Director of the Erik Castrén Institute of International Law and Human Rights
- Board member of: International Law Commission

Academic background
- Education: University of Turku (LL.B., LL.D.)
- Thesis: From Apology to Utopia: The Structure of International Legal Argument (1989)

Academic work
- Discipline: International law
- Sub-discipline: Critical legal studies, international legal theory
- School or tradition: Helsinki School
- Institutions: University of Helsinki; New York University
- Notable works: From Apology to Utopia (1989/2006); The Gentle Civilizer of Nations (2001); To the Uttermost Parts of the Earth (2021)
- Website: University of Helsinki

Martti Antero Koskenniemi (born 18 March 1953) is a Finnish international lawyer and former diplomat. Currently he is professor of International Law in the University of Helsinki and Director of the Erik Castrén Institute of International Law and Human Rights, as well as Centennial Professor at the Law Department of the London School of Economics. He is well known for his critical approach to international law. In 2008–2009 he held the seat of distinguished visiting Goodhart Professor at the Faculty of Law, Cambridge University. In 2011 Koskenniemi was Peace of Utrecht professor at Utrecht University. In 2014 he was elected a Corresponding Fellow of the British Academy. Koskenniemi is currently serving as an Academy Professor for the Academy of Finland.

Previously he has been Global Professor of Law in the New York University, and a member of the International Law Commission (2002–2006). He served in the Finnish Diplomatic Service in the years 1978–1996, lastly as director of the Division of International Law. He was Finland's counsel in the International Court of Justice in the Passage through the Great Belt case (Finland v. Denmark) (1991–1992).

From 1997 to 2003 he served as a judge in the administrative tribunal of the Asian Development Bank.

He is a member of the Institut de droit international.

== Writings ==
- From Apology to Utopia: The Structure of International Legal Argument (first published 1989, reissued in 2006; ISBN 978-0521546966) presents a critical view of international law as an argumentative practice that attempts to remove the political from international relations. It asserts that international law is vulnerable to criticisms of being either an irrelevant moralist utopia or an apology for Realpolitik.
- The Gentle Civilizer of Nations: The Rise and Fall of International Law 1870–1960 (2001; ISBN 978-0521548090) has two agendas. The first of these is to develop an intellectual history of international law, and to offer a critique of that history. The second is to offer a sociology of the profession of international law, using biographical studies of Hersch Lauterpacht, Carl Schmitt and Hans Morgenthau.
- Fragmentation of international law: difficulties arising from the diversification and expansion of international law: report of the Study Group of the International Law Commission, finalized by Martti Koskenniemi (2006) A/CN.4/L.682
- The Cambridge Companion to International Law (2012) ISBN 978-0521143080 doi:10.1017/CCO9781139035651
- To the Uttermost Parts of the Earth: Legal Imagination and International Power 1300–1870 (2021) ISBN 9780521745345.
- The Politics of International Law (2011) ISBN 9781841139395
