= Monism and dualism in international law =

The terms monism and dualism are used to describe two different theories of the relationship between international law and domestic law. Monism and dualism both offer approaches to how international law comes into effect within states, and how conflicts between national and international law are resolved. In practice, many states are partly monist and partly dualist in their actual application of international law in their national systems.

== Monism ==
Monists accept that the internal and international legal systems form a unity. Both national legal rules and international rules that a state has accepted, for example by way of a treaty, determine whether actions are legal or illegal. In most so-called "monist" states, a distinction between international law in the form of treaties, and other international law, e.g., customary international law or jus cogens, is made; such states may thus be partly monist and partly dualist.

In a pure monist state, international law does not need to be translated into national law. It is simply incorporated and has effect automatically in national or domestic laws. The act of ratifying an international treaty immediately incorporates the law into national law; and customary international law is treated as part of national law as well. International law can be directly applied by a national judge, and can be directly invoked by citizens, just as if it were national law. A judge can declare a national rule invalid if it contradicts international rules because, in some states, international rules have priority. In other states, like in Germany, treaties have the same effect as legislation, and by the principle of Lex posterior derogat priori ("Later law removes the earlier"), only take precedence over national legislation enacted prior to their ratification.

In its most pure form, monism dictates that national law that contradicts international law is null and void, even if it post-dates international law, and even if it is constitutional in nature. From a human rights point of view, for example, this has some advantages. For example, a country has accepted a human rights treaty, such as the International Covenant on Civil and Political Rights, but some of its national laws limit the freedom of the press. A citizen of that country, who is being prosecuted by his state for violating this national law, can invoke the human rights treaty in a national courtroom and can ask the judge to apply this treaty and to decide that the national law is invalid. They do not have to wait for national law that translates international law.

"So when someone in The Netherlands feels his human rights are being violated he can go to a Dutch judge and the judge must apply the law of the Convention. He must apply international law even if it is not in conformity with Dutch law".

== Dualism ==
Dualists emphasize the difference between national and international law, and require the transposition of the latter into the former. Without this translation, international law does not exist as law. International law has to be national law as well, or it is no law at all. If a state accepts a treaty but does not adapt its national law in order to conform to the treaty or does not create a national law explicitly incorporating the treaty, then it violates international law. But one cannot claim that the treaty has become part of national law. Citizens cannot rely on it and judges cannot apply it. National laws that contradict it remain in force. According to dualists, national judges never apply international law, only international law that has been translated into national law.

"International law as such can confer no right cognizable in the municipal courts. It is only insofar as the rules of international law are recognized as included in the rules of municipal law that they are allowed in municipal courts to give rise to rights and obligations".

In dualist systems, the supremacy of international law is not a rule.. Domestic courts cannot apply international laws unless they have been incorporated or transformed into domestic laws. However, the international court does not permit the invocation of contrary domestic laws as a defence. Sir Hersch Lauterpacht pointed out, the International Court's determination to discourage the evasion of international obligations, and its repeated affirmation of:

the self-evident principle of international law that a State cannot invoke its municipal law as the reason for the non-fulfillment of its international obligations.

If international law is not directly applicable, as is the case in dualist systems, then it must be translated into national law, and existing national law that contradicts international law must be "translated away". It must be modified or eliminated in order to conform to international law.

Again, from a human rights point of view, if a human rights treaty is accepted for purely political reasons, and states do not intend to fully translate it into national law or to take a monist view on international law, then the implementation of the treaty is very uncertain.

=== The problem of lex posterior ===
In dualist systems, international law must be translated into national law, and existing national law that contradicts international law must be "translated away". It must be modified or eliminated in order to conform to international law. However, the need for translation in dualist system causes a problem with regard to national laws voted after the act of translation. In a monist system, a national law that is voted after an international law has been accepted and that contradicts the international law, becomes automatically null and void at the moment it is voted. The international rule continues to prevail. In a dualist system, however, if the original international law has been translated into national law, this new national law can then be overridden by another newer national law on the principle of lex posterior derogat legi priori, the later law replaces the earlier one. This means that the country – willingly or unwillingly – violates international law. A dualist system requires continuous screening of all subsequent national law for possible incompatibility with earlier international law.

== Examples ==
In some countries, such as the United Kingdom, the dualist view is predominant. International law is only part of UK national law once it is accepted in national law. A treaty "has no effect in municipal law until an Act of Parliament is passed to give effect to it."

In other countries this distinction tends to be blurred.

In the vast majority of democratic countries outside the Commonwealth, the legislature, or part of the legislature, participates in the process of ratification, so that ratification becomes a legislative act, and the treaty becomes effective in international law and in municipal law simultaneously. For instance, the Constitution of the United States provides that the President "shall have power, by and with the advice and consent of the Senate, to make treaties, provided two-thirds of the Senators present concur" (Article II (2)). Treaties ratified in accordance with the Constitution automatically become part of the municipal law of the United States.

The United States has a "mixed" monist-dualist system; international law applies directly in US courts in some instances but not others. The Constitution's Supremacy Clause states that treaties are part of the supreme law of the land, as suggested by the quote above; however, the U.S. Supreme Court, in Medellín v. Texas (2008), held that some treaties are not "self-executing." Such treaties must be implemented by statute before their provisions may be given effect by national and sub-national courts. Similarly with regard to customary international law, the Supreme Court stated, in the case of The Pacquete Habana (1900), that "international law is part of our law". However, it also said that international law would not be applied if there is a controlling legislative, executive, or judicial act to the contrary.

== A matter of national legal tradition ==
International law does not determine which point of view is to be preferred, monism or dualism. Every state decides for itself, according to its legal traditions. International law only requires that its rules are respected, and states are free to decide on the manner in which they want to respect these rules and make them binding on its citizens and agencies.

"[T]he transformation of international norms into domestic law is not necessary from the point of view of international law…the necessity of transformation is a question of national, not of international law".

Both a monist state and a dualist state can comply with international law. All one can say is that a monist state is less at risk of violating international rules, because its judges can apply international law directly. Negligence or unwillingness to implement international law in national law can only pose a problem in dualist states. States are free to choose the way in which they want to respect international law, but they are always accountable if they fail to adapt their national legal system in a way that they can respect international law. Either they adopt a constitution that implements a monist system so that international law can be applied directly and without transformation, or they do not. But then they have to translate all international law in national law. A monist state relies only on the judges and not on the legislators, but judges can also make mistakes. If a judge in a monist state makes mistakes when applying international law, then the country violates international law just as much as a dualist country that, for one reason or another, does not allow its judges to apply international law directly and fails to translate or fails to translate correctly and effectively. One reason for preferring dualism is precisely the fear that national judges are not familiar with international law – a highly complex field of law – and hence are liable to make mistakes.

== See also ==
- International customary law
- Schubert Jurisprudence
- Legal pluralism
- List of national legal systems
- Rule according to higher law
