= Jurisprudence =

Theoretical study of law

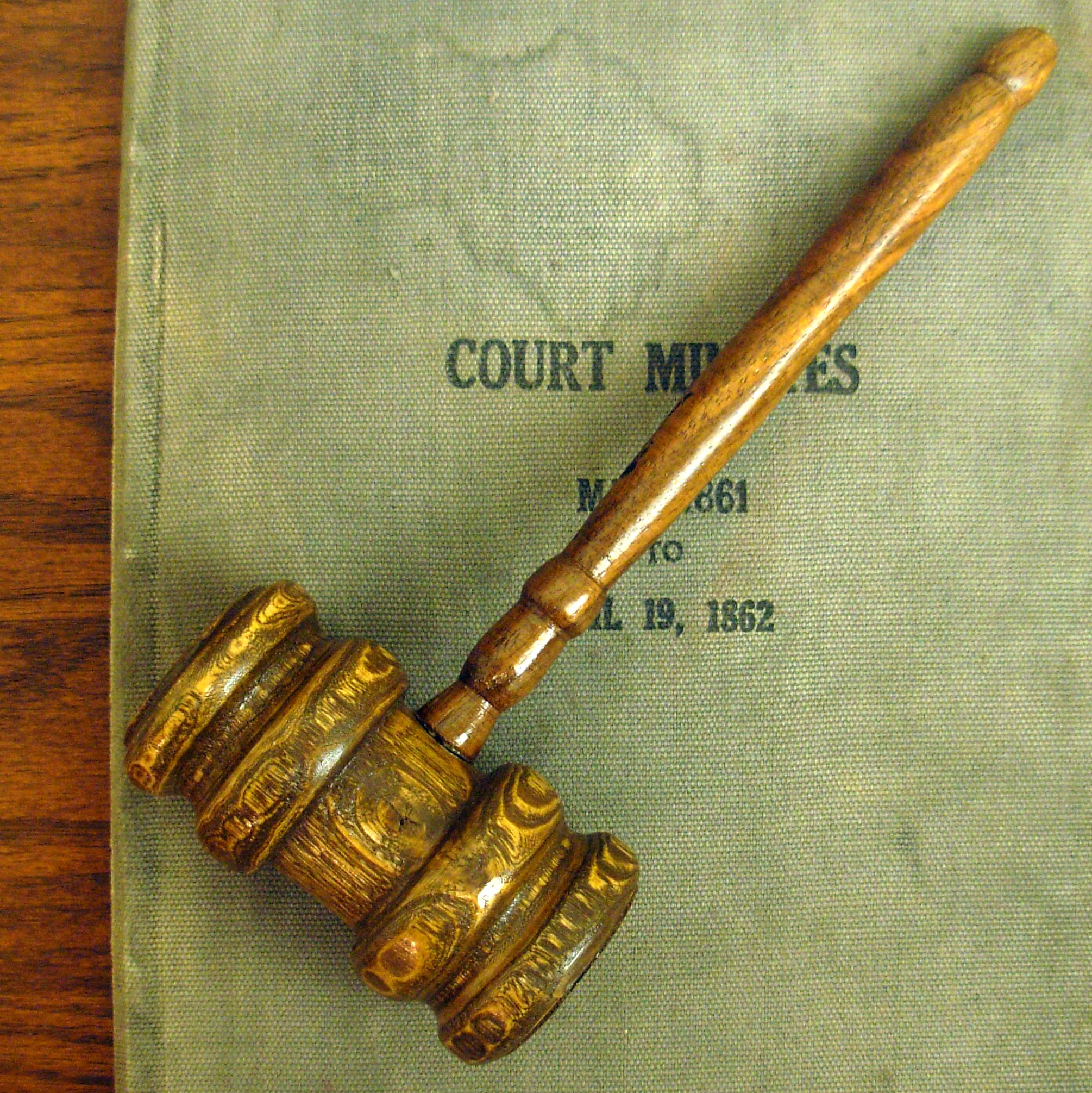
A gavel and court minutes from 1861–1862, symbolic of legal decisions

Jurisprudence, also known as legal theory or legal science, is the philosophy of law. As a field of knowledge, it applies philosophical methods to legal questions, such as what law is or how it ought to be.

Evidence of jurisprudential thought can be found in the writings of ancient philosophers, including Confucius (c. 551 – c. 479 BCE), Aristotle (384–322 BCE), and St Augustine (354–430 CE), who wrote broadly on moral and political philosophy. Among the oldest conceptions of law are natural law theories, instrumental theories of law, and law as reflective of social norms and custom. Contemporary mainstream academic jurisprudence traces its origin to the early 17th century and the Age of Enlightenment, which saw empiricist philosophers such as Hobbes, Hume, Locke, Montesquieu, and Rousseau rejecting religious conceptions of law and developing early concepts of the rule of law, justice, and constitutionalism.

By the twentieth century, the legal positivism of H. L. A. Hart and Hans Kelsen had become the dominant focus of jurisprudence, with analytical jurisprudence seeking to develop a general jurisprudential concept of law via the methods of analytic philosophy. Scholars of general jurisprudence inquire into the question of what law is. Other legal theorists seek to address particular philosophical questions relating to law, including the determination of valid laws and legal systems; the nature of legal norms, values, and doctrine; and the relationship between law and economics, ethics, history, sociology, and political philosophy.

Historically, the teaching of jurisprudence in common law jurisdictions has been separated from professional education in the law. Particularly in the United States, legal scholarship has eschewed general analytical jurisprudence in favour of legal realist and socio-legal approaches to law. Other research areas of legal theory include law and economics, critical legal studies, feminist legal theory, international law jurisprudence, comparative law, legal history, and the legal interpretivism of Ronald Dworkin.

== Definition and scope ==
As a coercive order, the law is distinguished from other social orders.

— Hans Kelsen

The word jurisprudence first appeared in written English in 1628, a loanword from the Latin iurisprudentia or prudentia iuris, meaning expertise (prudentia) in the law (iuris). According to the Oxford English Dictionary, the word's initial meaning was "Knowledge of or skill in law", but in English it has since become associated with the philosophy of law. In civil law jurisdictions, jurisprudence refers to case law or precedent, with legal philosophy being referred to as 'legal theory' or 'legal science'.

The study of jurisprudence can be divided into a number of areas of research. General jurisprudence is the study of the nature of law and aims to describe law and its characteristics generally and universally, irrespective of the jurisdiction or particular characteristics of a legal system. The central issues of contemporary general jurisprudence, particularly analytical jurisprudence, are what the relationship between law and morality is; how the law can be identified and distinguished from other systems of norms; and the necessary and sufficient criteria for law or a legal system to exist. Other areas of jurisprudence include normative jurisprudence, which aims to evaluate and critique law from a philosophical perspective, and critical legal studies, an area of critical theory as applied to law.

=== Methodology ===
Questions of general jurisprudence may be approached from a number of philosophical methodologies. Conceptual analysis is the dominant methodology in legal philosophy, particularly in analytical jurisprudence, which is concerned with the application of analytic philosophy to legal issues.

In the United States, legal scholarship eschews doctrinal or analytical approaches toward the law, but it is instead dominated by legal realism and the application of social science to law, such as law and economics, law and society, and critical legal theory. The objectives of much of United States jurisprudential scholarship differs, as such, in that it rejects the basis of legal reasoning as formalistic but rooted in power dynamics that ought to serve political, moral, and economic objectives.

==== Experimental jurisprudence ====
Experimental jurisprudence (X-Jur) is an emerging field of legal scholarship that explores the nature of legal phenomena through psychological investigations of legal concepts. The field departs from traditional analytic legal philosophy in its ambition to elucidate common intuitions in a systematic fashion employing the methods of social science. Equally, unlike research in legal psychology, X-Jur emphasises the philosophical implications of its findings, such as whether, how, and in what respects the law's content is a matter of moral perspective. While some legal theorists have welcomed the emergence of X-Jur, others have expressed reservations regarding its proposed contributions.

=== Significance and legal education ===
The importance of jurisprudence in legal practice and legal education is controversial. In common law jurisdictions, the study of jurisprudence is separate from the practice of law, with lawyers in medieval England having previously been trained via apprenticeship rather than academic study. At the same time, legal philosophers, such as Ronald Dworkin, have argued that an understanding of legal philosophy is relevant to legal practice as regards issues such as legal validity, human rights, statehood, the separation of powers, and the analysis of judicial interpretation.

== Intellectual history and schools ==
Evidence of early legal philosophy being carried out dates back to the 5th century BCE in Ancient Greece, Ancient India, and Ancient China. The focus of jurists depended, and still depends, upon the nature of the legal systems that they lived in, with the objectives of jurisprudence evolving over time and across jurisdictions.

Because early legal systems often lacked the sophisticated legal machinery, encompassing legislatures and independent courts, found in many modern jurisdictions, ancient philosophers, including Confucius (c. 551 – c. 479 BCE) and Aristotle (384–322 BC), more broadly focused on general principles of political philosophy, justice, and ethics, rather than formulating comprehensive theories of general jurisprudence. Contemporary questions of jurisprudence, as such, usually originate in the intellectual history during and after the 17th century.

=== Law as custom, religion ===
In early legal systems, including those in Greece, India, and England, the law was often regarded as customary, reflective of or codifying older legal practices and social norms. Historically, the common law courts regarded themselves as merely discovering the law that has existed since time immemorial, laws that reflect apparently ancient customs, norms, and rights. More recently, this school of thought was championed in the historical jurisprudence of the German politician Friedrich Carl von Savigny (1779–1861).

In his book On the Vocation of Our Age for Legislation and Jurisprudence, Savigny argued that Germany did not have a legal language that would support codification because the traditions, customs, and beliefs of the German people did not include a belief in a code.

==== Islamic jurisprudence ====
Fiqh (/fiːk/; Arabic: فِقْه [fɪqh]) is the term for Islamic jurisprudence. Fiqh is often described as the style of human understanding, research and practices of the sharia; that is, human understanding of the divine Islamic law as revealed in the Quran as well as the sunnah (the teachings and practices of the Islamic prophet Muhammad and his companions). Fiqh expands and develops sharia through interpretation (ijtihad) of the Quran and sunnah by Islamic jurists (ulama) and is implemented by the rulings (fatwa) of jurists on questions presented to them. Thus, whereas sharia is considered immutable and infallible by Muslims, fiqh is considered fallible and changeable.

=== Natural law ===
Natural law theory encompass both jurisprudential issues as well as broader issues of political and moral philosophy. Jurisprudential natural law theories are associated with the legal maxim, lex injustia non est lex (unjust law is not law), either as a criteria of validity for law (per classical natural law theory) or as relating to theoretical notions of justice and the proper purpose of law (per 'new natural law' theory).

Natural law relates to the nature of human beings and the consequent natural rights that flow from such nature, which either is or ought to be respected by valid positive law. The intellectual origin of natural law theory is often attributed to the Ancient Greeks, particularly in the works of Aristotle, although aspects of natural law thought have also been found in the majority of ancient civilisations, including in Chinese and Hebrew law.

Aristotelian natural law theory originates in his teleological view of nature and ethics, which asserted that which is good for man can be determined, by reason, from the functions of man, a view which later became popular among the Stoics. The Romans also had a conception of ius naturale, with Cicero asserting that "True law is right reason in agreement with nature", although Roman law jurists were themselves largely unconcerned with legal theory or Greek political philosophy but instead focused on issues of practical legal doctrine. Similarly, Aristotle himself, did not write extensively about natural rights or natural justice in his writings, but it was the medieval Catholic theologian Thomas Aquinas who interpreted Aristotle in developing classical natural law theory.

Classical natural law was hugely influential in the medieval development of canon law, international law, and political philosophy, later resulting in the social contract theory as developed by Rousseau and Locke. By the Age of Enlightenment, natural law philosophy had largely fallen out of favour among political and legal philosophers, with some exceptions, such as Edmund Burke and William Blackstone. Major criticisms of Thomist natural law were contained in the empiricist, social contractarian, and utilitarian ideals of Hume, Hobbes, and Bentham.

Twentieth-century philosophy, particularly legal philosophy, saw a resurgence of interest in natural law, specifically the new natural law of John Finnis, who offered a reinterpretation of Aristotle and Aquinas. Contemporary secular jurists continue to invoke naturalist arguments in asserting the existence of legally-recognised human rights, limitations to state power, and the ability of the courts to review the decisions of other bodies of state.

=== Analytic philosophy and analytical jurisprudence ===
The science of jurisprudence (or, simply and briefly, jurisprudence) is concerned with positive laws, or with laws strictly so called, as considered without regard to their goodness or badness.

— John Austin

One alternative theory to natural law was the command theory of law, which was a precursor to legal positivism, and which was first developed by medieval theorists, such as Grotius, and later refined by Enlightenment philosophers, such as Hobbes in Leviathan (1651). Hobbes political philosophy was expanded upon by the English jurist John Austin, who defined the law as "commands, backed by threat of sanctions, from a sovereign, to whom people have a habit of obedience" further argued that there was a distinction between the determination of law and its assesssment.

By the nineteenth and twentieth centuries, legal positivism had become the dominant view of jurisprudence. Legal positivism is the view that the content of law is dependent on social facts and that a legal system's existence is not constrained by morality. Within legal positivism, theorists agree that law's content is a product of social facts, but theorists disagree whether law's validity can be explained by incorporating moral values.

In common law jurisdictions, Jeremy Bentham is often regarded as an early leading figure in positivistic jurisprudence, serving as a mentor for John Austin, whose jurisprudence later influenced A. V. Dicey and was critiqued by the H.L.A. Hart. Hart, an ordinary language philosopher, claimed that law is the union of primary rules and secondary rules. Primary rules require individuals to act or not act in certain ways and create duties for the governed to obey. Secondary rules are rules that confer authority to create new primary rules or modify existing ones. Secondary rules are divided into rules of adjudication (how to resolve legal disputes), rules of change (how laws are amended), and the rule of recognition (how laws are identified as valid). The validity of a legal system derives from the "rule of recognition", a customary practice among officials (especially barristers and judges) who identify certain acts and decisions as sources of law.

While Hart's Concept of Law is regarded as the leading statement of legal positivism in the English-speaking world, in civil law jurisdictions, particularly those in Continental Europe, the Pure Theory of Law of the Austrian jurist Hans Kelsen is held in similarly high regard. Kelsen's views were influenced by the philosopher Immanuel Kant. His theory describes law as "binding norms" while simultaneously refusing to evaluate those norms. That is, "legal science" is to be separated from "legal politics". Central to the Pure Theory of Law is the notion of a 'basic norm' (Grundnorm)—a hypothetical norm, presupposed by the jurist, from which all "lower" norms in the hierarchy of a legal system, beginning with constitutional law, are understood to derive their authority or the extent to which they are binding. Kelsen contends that the extent to which legal norms are binding—their specifically "legal" character—can be understood without ultimately tracing it to some suprahuman source such as God, personified Nature, or—of great importance in his time—a personified State or Nation.

Contemporary positivists, following Hart, include Joseph Raz, Jules Coleman, Scott Shapiro, and Neil MacCormick.

==== Non-positivistic analytical theories ====
Hart's Concept of Law was criticised by the secular natural law theorist Lon Fuller and the American constitutional scholar Ronald Dworkin, leading to the Hart-Fuller and Hart-Dworkin debates. Other contemporary non-positivist scholars of analytical jurisprudence include the critical legal scholars Duncan Kennedy and Roberto Unger.

==== Legal interpretivism ====
American legal philosopher Ronald Dworkin's legal theory challenges legal positivists who separate the content of law from morality. In his book Law's Empire, Dworkin argued that law is an "interpretive" concept that requires barristers to find the best-fitting and most just solution to a legal dispute, given their constitutional traditions. According to him, law is not entirely based on social facts, but includes the best moral justification for the institutional facts and practices that form a society's legal tradition. It follows from Dworkin's view that one cannot know whether a society has a legal system in force, or what any of its laws are, until one knows some truths about the moral justifications of the social and political practices of that society. It is consistent with Dworkin's view—in contrast with the views of legal positivists or legal realists—that no-one in a society may know what its laws are, because no-one may know the best moral justification for its practices.

Interpretation, according to Dworkin's "integrity theory of law", has two dimensions. To count as an interpretation, the reading of a text must meet the criterion of "fit". Of those interpretations that fit, however, Dworkin maintains that the correct interpretation is the one that portrays the community's practices in the best light, or makes them "the best that they can be". But many writers have doubted whether there is a single best moral justification for the complex practices of any given community, and others have doubted whether, even if there is, it should be counted as part of the law of that community.

=== Legal realism ===
Whereas legal positivism became the most dominant approach toward legal philosophy in much of the world, legal realism gained prominence in United States law schools during the twentieth century, with legal scholars increasingly specialising in non-legal methods. Unlike the positivists, legal realists do not seek to apply conceptual analysis to the law but view legal theory as relating to a predictive system that describes the behavior of judges. Prominent figures in the legal realist movement include Brian Leiter, Oliver Wendell Holmes, and Karl Llewellyn.

Separately, the Scandinavian school of legal realism argued that law can be explained through the empirical methods used by social scientists. Prominent Scandinavian legal realists are Alf Ross, Axel Hägerström, and Karl Olivecrona. Scandinavian legal realists also took a naturalist approach to law.

==== Sociological jurisprudence ====
In the 1930s, the sociological jurisprudence (also known as the sociology of law, law and society, and socio-legal studies), split from the American legal realist movement, led by the Harvard Law School professor Roscoe Pound. At around the same time, in continental Europe, the "free law" movement emerged, which encouraged the use of sociological insights in the development of legal and juristic theory, as advocated by Hermann Kantorowicz in Germany, Eugen Ehrlich in Austria, and François Gény in France. The movement saw a brief decline in the second half of the twentieth century owing to the increasing popularity of analytical jurisprudence, before seeing a resurgence in the English-speaking world, particularly in the United States.

==== Critical legal studies ====
In the 1970s, critical legal studies (CLS) emerged as an explicitly left-wing development of the legal realist movement, drawing heavily upon the political theories of the Marxists, postmodernists, and critical theorists. CLS scholars include Peter Gabel, Morton Horwitz, Duncan Kennedy, Karl Klare, Mark Tushnet, and Roberto Unger.

=== Other schools ===
==== Therapeutic jurisprudence ====
Consequences of the operation of legal rules or legal procedures—or of the behavior of legal actors (such as lawyers and judges)—may be either beneficial (therapeutic) or harmful (anti-therapeutic) to people. Therapeutic jurisprudence studies law as a social force (or agent) and uses social science methods and data to study the extent to which a legal rule or practice affects the psychological well-being of the people it impacts.

==== Virtue jurisprudence ====
Aretaic moral theories, such as contemporary virtue ethics, emphasize the role of character in morality. Virtue jurisprudence is the view that the laws should promote the development of virtuous character in citizens. Historically, this approach has been mainly associated with Aristotle or Thomas Aquinas. Contemporary virtue jurisprudence is inspired by philosophical work on virtue ethics.

==== Law and economics ====
Law and economics, or economic analysis of law, is the application of microeconomic theory to the analysis of legal rules and institutions. The field emerged in the United States in the early 1960s, primarily through the work of scholars from the Chicago school of economics, such as Aaron Director, George Stigler, and Ronald Coase, and jurists, including Guido Calabresi. The field uses economics concepts to explain the effects of laws, assess which legal rules are economically efficient, and predict which legal rules will be promulgated. There are two major branches of law and economics. One is based on applying the methods and theories of neoclassical economics to the positive and normative analysis of the law. The second branch focuses on an institutional analysis of law and legal institutions, with a broader focus on economic, political, and social outcomes, and overlapping with analyses of the institutions of politics and governance.

Constitutional economics is a research program in economics and constitutionalism that has been described as explaining the choice "of alternative sets of legal-institutional-constitutional rules that constrain the choices and activities of economic and political agents". This extends beyond the definition of "the economic analysis of constitutional law" and is distinct from explaining the choices of economic and political agents within those rules, a subject of orthodox economics. Instead, constitutional economics takes into account the impacts of political economic decisions as opposed to limiting its analysis to economic relationships as functions of the dynamics of distribution of marketable goods and services.

==== Law and literature ====
The law and literature movement focuses on connections between law and literature. This field has roots in two developments in the intellectual history of law—first, the growing doubt about whether law in isolation is a source of value and meaning, or whether it must be plugged into a large cultural or philosophical or social-science context to give it value and meaning; and, second, the growing focus on the mutability of meaning in all texts, whether literary or legal. Work in the field comprises two complementary perspectives: Law in literature (understanding issues as they are explored in literary texts, thus studying law portrayed in literature) and law as literature (understanding legal texts with literary interpretation, analysis, and critique, therefore examining law as literature to be understood).

== Philosophical issues ==
=== Is-ought distinction ===
Theories of general jurisprudence, particularly analytical theories, have sought to confront the is-ought problem, which examines the differences between positive and normative statements. Legal positivists generally maintain a distinction between the two, relying on the arguments of Hume and Kant, regarding statements of law not as normative statements but positive statements that are ascribable to social facts. Some legal theorists, particularly legal realists, either reject the distinction or view it as unimportant. The distinction has greater significance, however, for natural law theorists who seek to assert that there are objective moral truths that provide the basis for a natural law, which may justify or invalidate enacted positive law.

=== State of nature ===
Hobbes was a social contractarian and believed that the law had people's tacit consent. He believed that society was formed from a state of nature to protect people from the state of war that would exist otherwise. In Leviathan, Hobbes argues that without an ordered society, life would be "solitary, poor, nasty, brutish and short." It is commonly said that Hobbes's views on human nature were influenced by his times. The English Civil War and the Cromwellian dictatorship had taken place; and, in reacting to that, Hobbes felt that absolute authority vested in a monarch, whose subjects obeyed the law, was the basis of a civilized society.

=== Rule of law ===
The rule of law ideal is commonly traced to Aristotle, who distinguished between the rule of man or of a tyrant and the rule of a system of laws, which also served to constrain the political power of officials.

=== Justice and liberty ===
Rawls's theory of justice uses a method called "original position" to ask us which principles of justice we would choose to regulate the basic institutions of our society if we were behind a "veil of ignorance". Imagine we do not know who we are—our race, sex, wealth, status, class, or any distinguishing feature—so that we would not be biased in our own favour. Rawls argued from this "original position" that we would choose the same political liberties for everyone, like freedom of speech, the right to vote, and so on. Also, we would choose a system with only inequality because it provides sufficient incentives for the economic well-being of all of society, especially the poorest. This is Rawls's famous "difference principle". Justice is fairness, in the sense that the fairness of the original position of choice guarantees the fairness of the principles chosen in that position.

==== Libertarian theories of law ====
Libertarian theories of law hold that the proper and legitimate function of law is limited: to protect an individual's rights to person, liberty, and property and to enforce voluntary agreements, rather than to redistribute resources or to engineer social outcomes. For libertarians, a law that exceeds the protective function is illegitimate and unjust, even it if has been enacted by representative political authorities.

An influential early work on the libertarian view is the pamphlet "The Law" (written originally in French "La Loi") by the French economist Frédéric Bastiat. He argued that individuals possess the rights to life, liberty, and property that exist prior to, and independent of legislation, contending that these did not come into being because laws were made, but that the laws were made because they had already existed. He defined law as the "collective organization of individual right of lawful defence", and held that its only legitimate purpose is to secure these pre-existing rights. When a law is used to take from some and give to others, it is "legal plunder". The term legal plunder refers to acts that are done through legislation, and would be a crime if done by a private person. For example, if a legislation is used to provide, social security to some, while others pay for it, it would be legal plunder since if someone did it directly, it would be theft. Bastiat argued that when the law is turned to such ends, whether through protectionism, subsidy, or socialism, it loses moral authority and provokes social conflicts.

Bastiat is generally read within the natural law tradition and as a precursor of later libertarian theories of law, developed in the 20th century: Frederick Hayek emphasized the rule of law and spontaneous order; Robert Nozick defended the minimal state; and Murray Rothbard advanced a rights-based theory deriving law from self-ownership and property.

=== Morality and the law ===
Legal positivists who argue against the incorporation of moral values to explain law's validity are labeled exclusive (or hard) legal positivists. Joseph Raz's legal positivism is an example of exclusive legal positivism. Legal positivists who argue that law's validity can be explained by incorporating moral values are labeled inclusive (or soft) legal positivists. The legal positivist theories of H. L. A. Hart and Jules Coleman are examples of inclusive legal positivism.

Legal positivism has traditionally been associated with three doctrines: the pedigree thesis, the separability thesis, and the discretion thesis. The pedigree thesis says that the right way to determine whether a directive is law is to look at the directive's source. The thesis claims that the fact that the directive was issued by the proper official within a legitimate government, for example, determines the directive's legal validity—not its moral or practical merits. The separability thesis states that law is conceptually distinct from morality. While law might contain morality, the separability thesis states that "it is in no sense a necessary truth that laws reproduce or satisfy certain demands of morality, though in fact they have often done so." Legal positivists disagree about the extent of the separability thesis. Exclusive legal positivists, notably Joseph Raz, go further than the standard thesis and deny that morality can be a part of law at all. The discretion thesis holds that judges create new law when they are given discretion to adjudicate cases in which existing law underdetermines the result.

Joseph Raz's theory of legal positivism argues against incorporating moral values in explaining the validity of law. In Raz's 1979 book The Authority of Law, he criticised what he called the "weak social thesis" to explain law. He formulates the weak social thesis as "(a) Sometimes the identification of some laws turn on moral arguments, but also with, (b) In all legal systems the identification of some law turns on moral argument." Raz argues that law's authority is identifiable purely through social sources, without reference to moral reasoning. This view he calls "the sources thesis". Raz suggests that any categorisation of rules beyond their role as authority is better left to sociology than to jurisprudence. Some philosophers used to contend that positivism was the theory that held that there was "no necessary connection" between law and morality; but influential contemporary positivists—including Joseph Raz, John Gardner, and Leslie Green—reject that view. Raz claims it is a necessary truth that there are vices that a legal system cannot possibly have (for example, it cannot commit rape or murder).

== Legal issues ==
=== Judicial interpretation ===
Judicial interpretation is the way in which the judiciary construes the law, particularly constitutional documents, legislation and frequently used vocabulary. This is an important issue in some common law jurisdictions such as the United States, Australia and Canada, because the supreme courts of those nations can overturn laws made by their legislatures via a process called judicial review.

=== International law ===
International legal theory, or theories of international law, comprise a variety of theoretical and methodological approaches used to explain and analyse the content, formation and effectiveness of international law and institutions and to suggest improvements. Some approaches center on the question of compliance: why states follow international norms in the absence of a coercive power that ensures compliance. Other approaches focus on the problem of the formation of international rules: why states voluntarily adopt international legal norms, that limit their freedom of action, in the absence of a world legislature (centralized legislature, court with compulsory jurisdiction, or an executive with enforcement powers). Other perspectives are policy oriented; they elaborate theoretical frameworks and instruments to criticize the existing rules and make suggestions on how to improve them. Some of these approaches are based on domestic legal theory, others are interdisciplinary, while others have been developed expressly to analyse international law.

==== History ====
Francisco de Vitoria was perhaps the first to develop a theory of ius gentium (law of nations), and thus is an important figure in the transition to modernity. He extrapolated his ideas of legitimate sovereign power to international affairs, concluding that such affairs ought to be determined by forms that respect the rights of all and that the common good of the world should take precedence over the good of any single state. This meant that relations between states ought to pass from being justified by force to being justified by law and justice. Some scholars have challenged the standard account of the origins of International law, which emphasises the seminal text De iure belli ac pacis by Hugo Grotius, and have argued for the importance of Vitoria and, later, Suárez as forerunners and, potentially, founders of the field. Others, such as Koskenniemi, have argued that none of these humanist and scholastic thinkers can be understood to have founded international law in the modern sense, instead placing its origins in the post-1870 period.

Francisco Suárez, regarded as among the greatest scholastics after Aquinas, subdivided the concept of ius gentium. Working with already well-formed categories, he carefully distinguished ius inter gentes from ius intra gentes. Ius inter gentes (which corresponds to modern international law) was something common to the majority of countries, although, being positive law, not natural law, it was not necessarily universal. On the other hand, ius intra gentes, or civil law, is specific to each nation.

=== Validity of immoral laws ===
Early jurists and philosophers, such as Cicero, Saint Augustine, and Aquinas, believed that an unjust law was not law at all, that is to say, where a (positive) law is pronounced that fails certain (natural) moral standards, it is invalid, non-binding, and may require disobedience.

=== Constitutionalism ===
Constitutionalism is "a compound of ideas, attitudes, and patterns of behavior elaborating the principle that the authority of government derives from and is limited by a body of fundamental law".

== List of philosophers of law ==
- Plato
- Aristotle
- Thomas Aquinas
- Karl Marx
- Simone Weil
- Francis Bacon
- John Locke
- Francisco Suárez
- Francisco de Vitoria
- Ferdinand Lasalle
- Hugo Grotius
- John Austin
- Frederic Bastiat
- Evgeny Pashukanis
- Jeremy Bentham
- Emilio Betti
- Norberto Bobbio
- António Castanheira Neves
- Jules Coleman
- Ronald Dworkin
- Luigi Ferrajoli
- Francesco D'Agostino
- Francisco Elías de Tejada y Spínola
- Carlos Cossio
- Miguel Reale
- José Pedro Galvão de Sousa
- John Finnis
- Lon L. Fuller
- Leslie Green
- Robert P. George
- Germain Grisez
- H. L. A. Hart
- Georg Wilhelm Friedrich Hegel
- Oliver Wendell Holmes Jr.
- Alf Ross
- Tony Honoré
- Rudolf Jhering
- Johann Gottlieb Fichte
- Hans Kelsen
- Joel Feinberg
- David Lyons
- Robert Alexy
- Reinhold Zippelius
- Neil MacCormick
- William E. May
- Martha Nussbaum
- François Ost
- Gustav Radbruch
- Joseph Raz
- Jeremy Waldron
- Friedrich Carl von Savigny
- Robert Summers
- Roberto Unger
- Catharine MacKinnon
- John Rawls
- Pierre Schlag
- Robin West
- Carl Schmitt
- Jürgen Habermas
- Geoffrey Warnock
- Scott J. Shapiro
- Shen Buhai
- Shang Yang
- Han Fei
- Zhu Xi
- Roscoe Pound
- Julius von Kirchmann
- Montesquieu
- Upendra Baxi

== See also ==
- Cautelary jurisprudence
- Defeasible reasoning
- Judicial activism
- Legal history
- Legal pluralism
- New legal realism
- Political jurisprudence
- Postmodernist jurisprudence
- Rule according to higher law
- Social policy
