= William E. May =

American theologian (1928–2014)

William E. May (May 27, 1928 – December 13, 2014) was an American theologian who was the Michael J. McGivney Emeritus Professor of Moral Theology at the Pontifical John Paul II Institute for Studies on Marriage and Family at The Catholic University of America in Washington, DC where he taught from 1991 to 2008.

He previously taught moral theology at The Catholic University of America from 1971 to 1991. Dr. May has also lectured and taught at various universities around the world and taught courses for the Catholic Distance University. Along with John Finnis, Robert P. George and Germain Grisez, and others, he was one of the major proponents of the new natural law theory, which draws on the ethics of Thomas Aquinas.

== Early life ==
May was born the second of three children of Robert W. May and Katherine A. Armstrong on May 27, 1928, in St. Louis, Missouri. His father was a Presbyterian (who later converted to Catholicism), but May was raised a Catholic by his mother. He felt a call to the priesthood while in the fourth grade, and especially wanted to become a missionary to China. When old enough, he entered the seminary and was sent to study philosophy followed by theology at The Catholic University of America. He was tonsured and received the minor orders of porter and acolyte. However, in 1952, because of a serious medical condition (diagnosed as petit mal epilepsy), he took some time off from seminary studies to teach in DeAndreis High School in north St. Louis. After teaching for a year, he took his supposed epileptic condition as a sign from God that he should pursue another vocation. (Although he had been told that he had petit mal epilepsy, and took medication and suffered seizures at times, he discovered in the late 1970s that the problem was not epilepsy, but was psychological in nature, and he experienced no seizures after 1977). He married Patricia Ann Keck on October 4, 1958. Together they raised seven children and now have many grandchildren. Because of his educational foundation, he found work as a book editor with various publishers from 1954 to 1970, until his teaching career began in 1971.

== Education and awards ==
May continued his education while an editor. He received his Bachelor of Arts and Master of Arts, both in philosophy, from The Catholic University of America, and his Ph.D. from Marquette University. He received the Cardinal Wright Award from the Fellowship of Catholic Scholars (1979), the Pro Pontifice et Ecclesia Medal (1991), and the Paul Ramsey Award in Bioethics from the Center for Bioethics and Culture (2007). He was also a member of the International Theological Commission from 1986 to 1997.

== Selected books ==
- Catholic Sexual Ethics: A Summary, Explanation, & Defense, with Ronald Lawler OFM Cap and Joseph Boyle, Huntington, IN: Our Sunday Visitor, 1998. [Third edition 2011]
- Catholic Bioethics and the Gift of Human Life, Huntington, IN: Our Sunday Visitor Press 2000. [Third edition 2013]
- An Introduction to Moral Theology, Huntington, Second edition, IN: Our Sunday Visitor Press, 2003.
- Marriage: The Rock on Which the Family Is Built, San Francisco: Ignatius, 1995. [Revised, expanded edition 2009]
- Standing with Peter, Bethune, SC: Requiem Press, 2006.
- The Unity of the Moral and Spiritual Life, New York: Franciscan Herald Press, 1979.
- Theology of the Body in Context: Genesis and Growth, Boston: Pauline Books & Media, 2010.
- Christ in Contemporary Thought, Dayton: Pflaum, 1970.
- Becoming Human: An Invitation to Christian Ethics, Dayton: Pflaum, 1975.
- Human Existence, Medicine, and Ethics: Reflections on Human Life, Chicago: Franciscan Herald Press, 1977.
- Sex, Marriage, and Chastity: Reflections of a Catholic Layman, Spouse, and Parent, Chicago: Franciscan Herald Press, 1981.
- Sex and the Sanctity of Human Life, Front Royal, VA: Christendom College Press, 1984.
- The Teaching of 'Humanae Vitae' A Defense (with Germain Grisez, Joseph M. Boyle, John Finnis, and John Ford, S.J.), San Francisco: Ignatius Press, 1988.
- Moral Absolutes: Catholic Tradition, Current Trends, and the Truth. The Pere Marquette Lecture in Theology, 1989, Milwaukee: Marquette University Press, 1989.
