= Radbruch (disambiguation) =

Radbruch may refer to:

== Places ==
- Radbruch, a municipality in the district of Lüneburg, in Lower Saxony, Germany

== People ==
- Gustav Radbruch, a German law professor and politician
- Knut Radbruch, a German mathematician
- Thomas Radbruch, a German photographer

== Other ==
- Radbruch formula
