= Tollefsen =

Tollefsen is a Norwegian surname which may refer to:

- Astrid Tollefsen (1897–1973), Norwegian lyricist
- Christopher Tollefsen (born 1968), American philosopher
- Even Tollefsen (1841–1897), Norwegian captain and inventor
- Mark Tollefsen (born 1992), American basketball player
- Olaf Tollefsen (1944–1989), American philosopher
- Ole-Kristian Tollefsen, Norwegian ice hockey player
- Signe Tollefsen, American-Dutch singer-songwriter
- Tollef Tollefsen (1885–1963), Norwegian rower
- Toralf Tollefsen (1914–1994), Norwegian concert accordionist
