= Joseph M. Boyle =

American philosopher (1942–2016)

- Born: 1942
- Died: 2016 (aged 73–74)
- Spouse: Barbara Dean
- Children: Marion, Thomas, MaryAnne

Education
- Education: Georgetown University (PhD)
- Thesis: The Argument from Self-Referential Consistency: The Current Discussion (1970)
- Doctoral advisor: Germain Grisez

Philosophical work
- Era: 21st-century philosophy
- Region: Western philosophy
- Institutions: University of Toronto, College of St. Thomas, Aquinas College (Michigan), St. Fidelis College
- Main interests: Ethics
- Notable ideas: New natural law theory

Joseph M. Boyle (1942 – 2016) was an American philosopher and Professor of Philosophy at the University of Toronto. He is known for his works on ethics. Boyle is a former president of the American Catholic Philosophical Association.

== Books ==
- Free Choice: A Self-Referential Argument, with Olaf Tollefsen and Germain Grisez, Notre Dame: University of Notre Dame Press, 1979
- Life and Death with Liberty and Justice: A Contribution to the Euthanasia Debate, with Germain Grisez, Notre Dame; University of Notre Dame Press, 1979
- Nuclear Deterrence, Morality, and Realism, with John Finnis and Germain Grisez, Oxford: Oxford University, 1987
- Catholic Sexual Ethics: A Summary, Defense, and Explanation, with Ronald David Lawler and William E. May, Huntington, Ind.: Our Sunday Visitor, 1984; updated 1996; 2nd ed. 1998; 3rd ed. 2011
- Natural Law Ethics in Theory and Practice: A Joseph Boyle Reader, edited by John Liptay and Christopher Tollefsen, Washington; The Catholic University of America Press, 2020
