= Joseph Boyle =

Joseph Boyle may refer to:

- Joseph M. Boyle (1942 – 2018), American philosopher
- Joseph W. Boyle (1867 – 1923), Canadian adventurer
