= Garantism (legal theory) =

Legal and political theory

Garantism, also known as the theory of constitutional guarantees, is a legal theory which conceives of the legal system as a set of guarantees designed to protect fundamental rights against abuses of power by public and private authorities.

As political philosophy, it was developed by Italian jurist Luigi Ferrajoli in the late 20th century: initially formulated in the field of criminal law, Ferrajoli later expanded it into a general theory of constitutional democracy.

== Origins and development ==
The origins of garantism lie in the application of habeas corpus and the subsequent development of Anglo-American case law: through the exclusionary rule and other prophylactic rules, it was established the judicial review of measures taken by public authorities that interfere with individual liberty.

As a method of interpretation of positive law, the "theory of constitutional guarantees" originates from Spain and Italy, where it is known as garantismo. Garantism proposes that every legitimate exercise of power must be conditioned by the existence of legal guarantees that protect individual and collective rights. In this framework, law is understood not merely as an instrument of power but rather as a system of limits and obligations imposed on power itself. The theory emphasizes the primacy of constitutional norms, legality, and procedural guarantees as foundations of the rule of law.

== Principles ==
Ferrajoli, a disciple of Norberto Bobbio, first articulated the concept in his seminal work Derecho y razón: Teoría del garantismo penal (Law and Reason: Theory of Penal Garantism, 1995). In it, he proposed a model of criminal justice grounded in strict legality and protection of individual rights. In subsequent works, including Principia iuris. Teoria del diritto e della democrazia (Principia Iuris: Theory of Law and Democracy, 2007), Ferrajoli expanded the concept to a broader constitutional and political theory, outlining a rational structure for democratic legality and human rights protection. Ferrajoli's garantism is based on several key principles:

- Legality – every act of state authority must be based on a prior legal norm.
- Separation of powers – institutional mechanisms must exist to control and limit power.
- Fundamental rights – constitutional rights are guarantees that bind both public and private actors.
- Justiciability – rights must be enforceable through independent courts.
- Proportionality and minimal penal intervention – particularly in criminal law, coercive power must be the last resort.

== Influence ==
Garantism has had major influence in Italian, Spanish, and Latin American legal thought, particularly in discussions of constitutionalism, human rights, and criminal procedure. In the Spanish-speaking world, many of Ferrajoli’s works have been translated by Perfecto Andrés Ibáñez, a former magistrate of the Supreme Court of Spain. The theory has also shaped debates within the National Autonomous University of Mexico (UNAM) and other European and Latin American universities.

== Selected works by Luigi Ferrajoli ==
- 1995 – Law and Reason: Theory of Penal Garantism. Madrid: Editorial Trotta.
- 1999 – Rights and Guarantees: The Law of the Weakest. Madrid: Editorial Trotta.
- 2004 – Epistemology and Garantism. Mexico CIty: UNAM.
- 2006 – Penal Garantism. Mexico City: UNAM.
- 2007 – Principia iuris: Theory of Law and Democracy. Vols. 1–3. Rome–Bari: Editori Laterza.
- 2008 – Democracy and Garantism. Madrid: Editorial Trotta.
- 2019 – Manifesto for Equality. Madrid: Editorial Trotta.
- 2022 – For an Earth Constitution: Humanity at the Crossroads. Madrid: Editorial Trotta.

== See also ==
- Constitutionalism
- Human rights
- Legal positivism
- Penal populism
- Error of impunity

== Bibliography ==
=== Articles ===
- García Jaén, Braulio (28 March 2020). "Luigi Ferrajoli, filósofo: 'Los países de la UE van cada uno por su lado defendiendo una soberanía insensata'" [Luigi Ferrajoli, philosopher: "The EU countries are each going their own way, defending a senseless sovereignty"]. El País (in Spanish).

=== Books ===
- Ferrajoli, Luigi (1999). Derechos y garantías. La ley del más débil [Rights and Guarantees: The Law of the Weakest]. Madrid: Trotta. ISBN 978-84-8164-285-8 – via Google Books.
- Ferrajoli, Luigi (2004). Derecho y razón. Teoría del garantismo penal [Law and Reason: Theory of Penal Garantism] (in Spanish). Madrid: Trotta. ISBN 978-84-8164-495-1 – via Google Books.
- Moreso, José Juan (2021). "An Italian Path to Legal Positivism: Ferrajoli's Garantismo". In Ratti, Giovanni Battista; Pattaro, Enrico (eds.). The Cambridge Companion to Legal Positivism. Cambridge: Cambridge University Press. pp. 430–454. ISBN 978-1-108-66363-2 – via Cambridge University Press & Assessment; Google Books.

=== Encyclopedias ===
- "Garantismo" [Garantism]. Treccani (in Italian). Rome: Italian Encyclopedia Institute. 2012.
- Ippolito, Dario; Sandro, Paolo (2023). "Garantism". In Kirste, Stephan; Sellers, Mortimer (eds.). Encyclopedia of the Philosophy of Law and Social Philosophy. Dordrecht: Springer. doi:10.1007/978-94-007-6730-0_109-1 – via SpringerLink.
