= Hart–Fuller debate =

1958 exchange published in the Harvard Law Review

The Hart–Fuller debate is an exchange between the American law professor Lon L. Fuller and his English counterpart H. L. A. Hart, published in the Harvard Law Review in 1958 on morality and law, which demonstrated the divide between the positivist and natural law philosophy. Hart took the positivist view in arguing that morality and law were separate. Fuller's reply argued for morality as the source of law's binding power.

== Nazi informer case ==
The debate discusses the verdict rendered by a decision of a post-war West German court on the following case:

"In 1944, defendant, desiring to get rid of her husband, reported to the authorities derogatory remarks he has made about Hitler while home on leave from the German army. Defendant wife having testified against him, the husband was sentenced to death by a military tribunal apparently pursuant to statutes making it illegal to assert or repeat any statements inimical to the welfare of the Third Reich. . . . However, after serving some time in prison, the husband was sent to the front. Following the defeat of the Nazi regime, the wife, as well as the judge who had sentenced her husband, was indicted under § 289 of the German Criminal Code of 1871, for the unlawful deprivation of another's liberty ('rechtswidrige Freiheitsberaubung'). On appeal to a German Court of last resort in criminal cases, held, that the sentencing judge should be acquitted, but that the wife is guilty since she utilised out of free choice a Nazi 'law' which is contrary 'to the sound conscience and sense of justice of all decent human beings' about the death or imprisonment of her husband."

— Harvard Law Review, 1951, pp. 1005–7

== Philosophy ==
=== Context ===
Jurisprudence refers to analysis of the philosophy of law. Within jurisprudence there are multiple schools of thought, but the Hart–Fuller debate concerns just legal positivism and natural-law theory. Legal positivists believe that "so long as [an] unjust law is a valid law, one has a legal obligation to obey it". Positivists disregard the morality of valid laws and treat law as the sole source of authority on what is valid. Natural-law theorists see a direct connection between validity and morality.

=== Initial essays ===
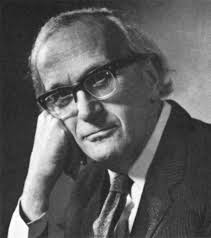
H.L.A. Hart

In Hart's initial paper, "Positivism and the Separation of Law and Morals", he establishes that the "Command Theory" perspective of Legal Positivism, which was stated by John Austin and holds that laws are commands to human beings, is inadequate as it does not accurately represent the nature of laws. Hart then defends the problem of "the core and the penumbra", which arises when a law's meaning is up for interpretation. The problem of the penumbra arises when the definition of a word in a law is inadequate in deciding the outcome of a case, leading to human interpretation of the law as the deciding factor. An example is a law that refers to a vehicle, which would clearly mean automobile in a core case, but in the penumbra case, the vehicle in question is an airplane, or motorcycle. Hart suggested that rather than interpreting the law with respect to subjective moral values on the given word, the law should be interpreted with respect to the law's purpose. Finally, Hart approaches the criticism of separation of law and morals in an environment of extreme evil law. He discusses the views of Radbruch and Kelsen on the Nazi regime's extremely corrupt legal system. From this discussion, he moves to analyzing the Nazi informer case. In this analysis, he disagrees with the reasoning for the court's ruling, and presents two alternatives: let the woman go unpunished, which he acknowledges is not morally correct, or punish her, and admit that it would set a dangerous precedent of retrospective law. Hart says that these two choices are both evil, which shows that hiding the morality of law is no solution.

In Fuller's response to "Positivism and the Separation of Law and Morals", titled "Positivism and Fidelity to Law: A Reply to Professor Hart", he criticizes Hart's failure to acknowledge the morality involved in the creation of law, and rejects his suggestion to interpret an entire law's objective rather than the individual words' meanings. Fuller says that the type of respect we give to human laws must be different from the respect we give a scientific law. For a law to deserve our respect, it must "represent some general direction human effort that we can understand and describe", and the principle of the law must be unconditionally valid.

In the first section, "The Definition of Law", Fuller breaks down the difference of opinion between Austin, Gray, Bentham, and Holmes, all positivists whom Hart defended. Fuller says that the positivist claim that however law is defined, it is different from morals, is useless. He then says that Hart's thesis is incomplete due to the useless idea he referenced, and that for it to be complete, he would have to define law in a way that "will make meaningful the obligation of fidelity to law".

In the next section, "The Definition of Morality", Fuller likens those who agree with Hart to people building defense for a village, knowing whom they want to protect, but not whom they are protecting them from. The thing they are trying to protect is the integrity of the concept of law, and their defense is a precise definition of law, but the attackers are what their definitions do not apply to. Fuller interprets Hart's examples of the many degrees of "what ought to be" that are immoral, concluding that Hart is reminding positivists that the program that they adopt may come with undesirable moral consequences. Fuller agrees with this point, and follows up with the following observations and questions:

1. Fuller observes that Hart assumes that evil objectives have the same coherence and logic as good objectives, and he disagrees with this, holding that coherence and goodness have more correlation than coherence and evil. He then states his belief that when someone explains their decisions, the decisions will move toward goodness. Finally, he rejects the idea that a legal system will over time work itself toward goodness case by case, arguing that it will instead entrench itself in unjust behavior.
2. Fuller questions the idea that the decline of the separation between law and morality would allow immoral values to be ingrained in the justice system, asking what the protection against this risk would be. He then says that the answer is not in the works of Austin, Gray, Holmes, and Hart, as they break the problem into a state of simplicity that ignores the true dangers.
3. Fuller hypothesizes a situation in which a judge aims to pursue a goal that most citizens would view as morally wrong, and asks whether the judge would be likely to make their decision based on a higher moral principle or aim to keep the interpretation consistent with existing laws and explain the decision in a way that aligns with the laws.
4. Fuller hypothesizes a situation in which he and Hart are in a country where their beliefs are the minority, and they believe that the majority's beliefs are evil. He says they would worry that laws would be manipulated to operate against their beliefs, but doubts that they would worry that someone would challenge those laws, appealing to the majority evil beliefs. He says that even in the most oppressive institutions there is a reluctance to codify extremely evil laws, and that it is clear that the reluctance stems from a tendency to associate law with easily justifiable morals.
5. Fuller says that in populations where the judicial process functions effectively, it is very unlikely that immoral law will be integrated. He defends this by giving the example of commercial law in Britain adopting a "law-is-law" formalism, going against the work in the field by Lord Mansfield. At this time, this situation grew to be a large problem as many commercial cases were taken to arbitration. Fuller says the reason for this shift toward arbitration is that arbitrators are willing to offer a more flexible process that considers the needs of the situation and industry more. At the end, Fuller says that even though Hart rejects "formalism", he believes that Hart's theory leans in the direction of formalism.
6. Fuller references the Pope's 1949 edict to Roman Catholic jurists not to pass sentences based on laws the church sees as unjust, saying that this is an instance of a bias that often influences how one perceives a subject. He says that this is a conflict between two different kinds of law, and that in such a situation, it is difficult to have a meaningful exchange on the topic, which may affect readers of Hart's essay.

In Fuller's third section, "The Moral Foundations of a Legal Order", he begins by agreeing with Hart's analysis of the command theory. He then says he predicted that Hart would acknowledge the role of morals in law-making and critiques Hart for not acknowledging the relationship. This brings him to analyzing Austin's Lectures V and VI on Jurisprudence, bringing up the inconsistencies in Austin's theories that could have easily brought him to abandon his command theory. Fuller then asks how the words "fundamental" and "essential" could be defined given Hart's idea of fundamental rules specifying the essential legislative process. He acknowledges that Kelsen's theory had an answer to this, but it is achieved by simplifying reality so much that it can be absorbed by positivism. Fuller says that written constitutions are vital in legal systems, and should be provisionally accepted as good law.

In Fuller's fifth section, "The Problem of Restoring Respect for Law and Justice After the Collapse of a Regime That Respected Neither", he looks at the Nazi informer case. Fuller believed none of the Nazi laws were valid, as the entire regime was evil and the law-making process lacked internal morality.

=== The Morality of Law ===
Fuller denied the core claim of legal positivism that there is no necessary connection between law and morality. According to Fuller, certain moral standards, which he calls "principles of legality," are built into the very concept of law, so that nothing counts as genuine law that fails to meet these standards. In virtue of these principles of legality, the law has an inner morality that imposes a minimal morality of fairness. Some laws, he admits, may be so wicked or unjust that they should not be obeyed. But even in these cases, he argues, there are positive features of the law that impose a defensible moral duty to obey them.

According to Fuller, all purported legal rules must meet eight minimal conditions in order to count as genuine laws. The rules must be (1) sufficiently general, (2) publicly promulgated, (3) prospective (i.e., applicable only to future behavior, not past), (4) at least minimally clear and intelligible, (5) free of contradictions, (6) relatively constant, so that they don't continuously change from day to day, (7) possible to obey, and (8) administered in a way that does not wildly diverge from their obvious or apparent meaning. These are Fuller's "principles of legality." Together, he argues, they guarantee that all law will embody certain moral standards of respect, fairness, and predictability that constitute important aspects of the rule of law.

Following the two essays, Fuller presented his argument more fully in his book, The Morality of Law, with a story about an imaginary king named Rex who attempts to rule but finds he is unable to do so in any meaningful way when any of these conditions are not met. Fuller contends that the purpose of law is to subject "human conduct to the governance of rules". If any of the eight principles is flagrantly lacking in a system of governance, the system will not be a legal one. The more closely a system is able to adhere to them, the nearer it will be to the rule-of-law ideal, though in reality all systems must make compromises and will fall short of perfect ideals of clarity, consistency, stability, and so forth.

In a review of The Morality of Law, Hart criticises Fuller's work, saying that these principles are merely ones of means-ends efficiency; it is inappropriate, he says, to call them a morality. Employing Fuller's eight principles of legality, one could just as well have an inner morality of poisoning as an inner morality of law, which Hart claims is absurd. In this phase of the argument, the positions of the disputants are transposed. Fuller proposes principles that would easily fit into a positivistic account of law and Hart points out that Fuller's principles could easily accommodate an immoral morality.

== See also ==
- Hart–Dworkin debate
- Hart–Devlin debate
- Legal positivism
- Natural law
