= Hart–Devlin debate =

Legal philosophy debate

The Hart–Devlin debate was a famous debate in the mid-twentieth century between legal philosophers Patrick Devlin and H. L. A. Hart about whether the law is a suitable tool for the enforcement of morality. The debate arose in the context of a proposal to decriminalize homosexuality in the United Kingdom. Devlin argued that the law is a suitable tool to enforce morality, while Hart disagreed.

== See also ==
- Legal moralism
- Wolfenden report
- Hart–Fuller debate
- Hart–Dworkin debate

== Sources ==
- Allan, James (2017). "Revisiting the Hart-Devlin Debate: At the Periphery and By the Numbers". San Diego Law Review. 54 (2): 423. ISSN 0036-4037.
- Cane, Peter (2006). "Taking Law Seriously: Starting Points of the Hart/Devlin Debate". The Journal of Ethics. 10 (1/2): 21–51. ISSN 1382-4554.
- Caron, Yves (1969). "The Legal Enforcement of Morals and the So-Called Hart-Devlin Controversy". McGill Law Journal. 15 (1).
- Cranor, Carl F. (1983). "Bibliographical essay / the hart‐Devlin debate". Criminal Justice Ethics. 2 (1). Informa UK Limited: 59–65. doi:10.1080/0731129x.1983.9991720. ISSN 0731-129X.
- Feinberg, Joel (1987). "Some unswept debris from the hart-devlin debate". Synthese. 72 (2). Springer Science and Business Media LLC: 249–275. doi:10.1007/bf00413641. ISSN 0039-7857.
- George, Robert P. (1995). Making Men Moral: Civil Liberties and Public Morality. Clarendon Press. ISBN 978-0-19-102960-8.
- HÄYRY, HETA (1991). "Liberalism and Legal Moralism: The Hart-Devlin Debate and Beyond". Ratio Juris. 4 (2). Wiley: 202–218. doi:10.1111/j.1467-9337.1991.tb00093.x. ISSN 0952-1917.
- Miller, B. W. (2010). "Morals Laws in an Age of Rights: Hart and Devlin at the Supreme Court of Canada". The American Journal of Jurisprudence. 55 (1). Oxford University Press (OUP): 79–103. doi:10.1093/ajj/55.1.79. ISSN 0065-8995.
- Richter, Duncan J. (2001). "Social Integrity and Private 'Immorality' The Hart-Devlin Debate Reconsidered". Essays in Philosophy. 2 (2): 55–65. doi:10.5840/eip2001223. ISSN 1526-0569.
- Stanton-Ife, John (2022-01-29). "The Limits of Law". Stanford Encyclopedia of Philosophy.
- "Law and Morality: The Hart-Devlin Debate - 22 - v3 - Cavendish: Jurisp". Taylor & Francis. 2002-02-14.
