= Natural Law and Natural Rights =

1980 book by John Finnis

- Cover of the first edition
- Author: John Finnis
- Language: English
- Series: Clarendon Law Series
- Subjects: Natural law Natural rights
- Publisher: Oxford University Press
- Publication date: 1980
- Publication place: United Kingdom
- Media type: Print (Hardcover and Paperback)
- Pages: 500 (2011, 2nd edition)
- ISBN: 0199599149

Natural Law and Natural Rights (1980; second edition 2011) is a book by John Finnis first published by Oxford University Press, as part of the Clarendon Law Series. Finnis develops a philosophy of Law in the tradition of Aristotle and Thomas Aquinas – Natural Law. His presentation and defence of Natural Law can be explored from three perspectives. First, polemical, by contradistinction with other philosophies of Law. Second, through its particular methodology, based on practical reasoning. Third, through its substantive content in the form of basic human goods. In addition, his 2011 edition included an extensive postscript, which is briefly discussed in the fourth section. The book is written as a collection of essays on a wide range of topics guided by an overall theme.

== Polemical ==
Finnis critiques a number of authors and philosophical traditions, thereby offering polemical support for his conception of Natural Law. An illustration of this (by no means exhaustive) follows below.

- Consequentialism (and utilitarianism). Finnis argues that consequentialist arguments are frustrated by the impossibility of predicting consequences and the impossibility of maximising incommensurable ends and choices.
- David Hume. Finnis acknowledges the validity of Hume's critique of Samuel Clarke's Natural Law on the basis that it derives moral obligations ("ought") from the fact of things or actions being "good" ("is"). However, Finnis claims that this is not applicable to his own version of Natural Law where the moral obligation ("ought") and its "goodness" derive from practical reasoning.
- Francisco Suarez. Finnis criticises Suarez for misinterpreting Aquinas by, among other things, adopting a "rationalist" view of Natural Law focused on the (presumed) ability of the intellect to recognise whether a given choice accords with human nature or not.
- H. L. A. Hart. Hart was Finnis’ PhD supervisor and the force behind his writing the book. However, he regrets that Hart's The concept of Law refuses to engage with moral content and fails to recognise moral purpose in legal punishment (as opposed to mere vindictiveness).
- Immanuel Kant. Finnis argues that Kant reduces human nature to practical reason devoid of moral content.
- John Rawls: Finnis argues that Rawls’ original position in A Theory of Justice excludes the possibility of adopting positions as matter of principle, e.g., including positions that might clash with those of others. The result is an impoverished view of human flourishing.
- Joseph Raz. Finnis corrects Raz's Practical Reason and Norms's misinterpretation of his Natural Law.
- Robert Nozick: Finnis argues against Nozick's notion of coercive State (in Anarchy, State and Utopia) noting that individuals (and not only the State) owe a duty of distributive justice to other individuals.
- Plato. Finnis attributes to Plato the origin of Natural Law conceptions, further developed by Aristotle and Aquinas. This includes a contemplative notion of man's relation to the divine. Yet, Finnis critiques communistic conceptions of human society based on Plato's Republic because they overlook the importance of human commitment. He distinguishes such notions from subsidiarity.
- Ronald Dworkin. Finnis critiques Dworkin for emptying the legal institution of moral content.

Among others, Finnis critiques Thomas Hobbes, Jeremy Bentham, and both critiques and praises, John Austin, W.N. Hohfeld and Max Weber. Whilst following them, he also notes substantive limitations in Aquinas’ and Aristotle's accounts of Natural Law.

== Methodology ==
The methodology that gives rise to Finnis's conception of Natural Law is based on practical reasoning or reasonableness. For Finnis, practical reasoning is the making of choices about the kind of life that we want to live. Such choices are guided through participation in (through a natural apprehension of), and (subsequent) reflection on, the basic goods (listed in the next section). Choices, and acts that follow from such choices, may prioritise some basic goods over others but cannot overlook any of them, or involve arbitrary preferences among persons – such arbitrariness is avoided through a benevolent impartial judgment (as distinguished from the ‘veil of ignorance') - and will seek the good of the whole community or common good. The common good includes distributive and commutative obligations of justice to others. Morality is practical reasoning which makes life worth living by respecting these conditions.

This same logic applies to the making of laws. However, like day-to-day choices, the making of laws, may on a peremptory basis be guided by more immediate reasons. Yet, such reasons will be ultimately grounded in practical reasoning, and this will reveal itself now and then in legal argumentation, as it does in the effort of individuals to explain their choices.

However, there may be laws (as human choices more generally) that do not take account of all the conditions of practical reasoning described above. Thereby, they lose their moral authority since individuals will be inclined to disregard them as not satisfying their own understanding of a good life. Nevertheless, such laws remain legally binding through the enforcement procedures provided by the legal system and through their importance for peaceful coexistence. Through the junction of legal and moral, Natural Law becomes the focal meaning of law.

Practical reasoning ultimately is insufficient to give us certainty that our choices are worth making. Thus, we tend to assume metaphysical justifications, which point to some external state of affairs D. This D is God.

Incidentally, Finnis argues that people should not despair from failing in their life goals, provided they have participated in the basic goods.

== Basic Goods ==
The list of basic forms of human good or basic goods is as follows:

- practical reasoning or reasonableness, as described above;
- life, including the procreation of children;
- knowledge, meaning the desire to know truth from confusion;
- play, as an activity that is absorbing but has no utility beyond the participation in the activity itself;
- aesthetic experience, that is, beauty in things or actions;
- sociability (friendship), involving commitment to the interests and well-being of others;
- religion, which concerns the metaphysical (as described above); and
- marriage, added in the Postscript.

The basic goods are distinguished from virtues, which are ways of pursuing the basic goods.

== Postscript ==
The postscript systematically reviews all the arguments in the book, expanding and clarifying them by reference to Finnis' other writings. It is significant that in p. 425, Finnis notes that "the book has significant weaknesses. But its main purposes and main positions remain intact." Some issues discussed in the Poscript are noted below.

- The good of the person is the unifying theme for all basic goods.
- Marriage is a basic good, because it is a multiple source of human flourishing.
- The basic good of play indicates excellence in work or play.
- Finnis notes that, in his later writings, "aesthetic experience" is included in the basic good of knowledge. In addition, religion is redefined as "harmony with the widest reaches and most ultimate source of all reality, including meaning and value." (p. 448) He argues that his account of what can be rationally said about God is too limited (and it is further explored by Aquinas).
- Friendship includes "fellow-feeling among human persons." (p. 457)
- Finnis suggests that his amended list of basic goods is likely to be complete.
- There is priority among the basic goods. Life is a precondition of the others and practical reasonableness structures the pursuit and realization of the other basic goods.
- Incommensurability applies between basic goods, as well as within each basic good and between persons.
- "Social justice" (Quadragesimo Anno) replaces Cajetan's legal justice, standing in addition to distributive and commutative justice. Social justice tends to unity by begging of individuals the question "to which community do I really belong in a contest of allegiances?" (p. 462).
- The common good is the outcome of pursuit of the basic goods (especially friendship, which leads to cooperation). It can be enforced by the State when conceived as a "public good".

== See also ==
- New natural law
