= Political jurisprudence =

Judges as part of a political process

Political jurisprudence is a legal theory that some judicial decisions are best understood as part of a political process, with judges operating as political actors. That is, judges are sometimes influenced by public opinion, political activists, and government officials, and their work can be understood as a way of legitimizing and institutionalizing the preferences of these political actors.

== Description ==
According to Professor Martin Shapiro of University of California, Berkeley, who first noted the theory in 1964: "The core of political jurisprudence is a vision of courts as political agencies and judges as political actors." Legal decisions are no longer focused on a judge's analytical analysis (as in Analytical jurisprudence), but rather it is the judges themselves that become the focus for determining how the decision was reached. Political jurisprudence advocates that judges are not machines but are influenced and swayed by the political system and by their own personal beliefs of how the law should be decided. That is not to say necessarily that judges arbitrarily make decisions they personally feel should be right without regard to stare decisis. Instead they are making decisions based on their political, legal, and personal beliefs as it relates to the law. Deeply, and with more implication for the society, the decisions of the judges are not only modified from the politics, but modify itself the politics and the process of law making in a so influential way, that we can say that the policy-making is "judicialized".

Political jurisprudence can also be seen as a discipline of law. Unlike natural law which answers the fundamental law question by placing law as inherent in the hierarchy of nature, political jurisprudence present the answer as being deliberate human political process. Political jurisprudence presents law as a revolving concept which changes due to change in political perspectives.

== Macro and micro ==
Shapiro noted political jurisprudence as having two wings, the macro wing and the micro wing. The macro wing looks at courts as players in the political process. In their processes of decision making, they entertain matters from different interest groups hence shape policy through pressure from these. the micro wing looks at individual decisions of judges. The second wing is a manifestation of Charles H. Pritchett who introduced behaviorism into USA judicial studies after studies that showed individual decisions in courts have been increasing since the days of President Roosevelt.

== Case studies ==
The 1953 Pakistani constitutional coup has been presented as an example of political jurisprudence. The Federal Court of Pakistan's 1955 decision in Federation of Pakistan v. Maulvi Tamizuddin Khan gave legitimacy to the coup d’état.

A Turkish judicial decision has also been presented as an example of political jurisprudence. The Turkish Constitutional Court judged against a constitutional amendment which was procedurally correct.

== See also ==
- Jurisprudence
- Alec Stone Sweet
