= Legal moralism =

Theory of jurisprudence

Legal moralism is the theory of jurisprudence and the philosophy of law which holds that laws may be used to prohibit or require behavior based on society's collective judgment of whether it is moral. It is often given as an alternative to legal liberalism, which holds that laws may only be used to the extent that they promote liberty. The debate between moralism and liberalism attracted much attention following the publication by the UK Parliament of the Wolfenden Report in 1957, which recommended that homosexuality should be decriminalised on the basis that the function of the law "is not... in our view... to intervene in the private life of citizens, or to seek to enforce any particular pattern of behaviour". Over the following years, H. L. A. Hart and Patrick Devlin, Baron Devlin contributed significantly to the body of literature.

== See also ==
- Constitutionalism
- Constitutional economics
- Rule according to higher law
