= Hart–Dworkin debate =

Legal philosophy debate

The Hart–Dworkin debate is a debate in legal philosophy between H. L. A. Hart and Ronald Dworkin. At the heart of the debate lies a Dworkinian critique of Hartian legal positivism, specifically, the theory presented in Hart's book The Concept of Law. While Hart insists that judges are within bounds to legislate on the basis of rules of law, Dworkin strives to show that in these cases, judges work from a set of "principles" which they use to formulate judgments, and that these principles either form the basis, or can be extrapolated from the present rules.

== See also ==
- Hart–Fuller debate
- Hart–Devlin debate
- Legal positivism
