= An unjust law is no law at all =

Latin legal maxim

An unjust law is no law at all (Latin: lex iniusta non est lex) is an expression in support of natural law, acknowledging that authority is not legitimate unless it is good and right. It has become a standard legal maxim around the world.

This view is strongly associated with natural law theorists, including John Finnis and Lon Fuller.

== History ==
Throughout history, philosophical and religious writers have often objected to unjust laws. For example, in Isaiah 10:

Woe to those who make unjust laws,

to those who issue oppressive decrees,
to deprive the poor of their rights

and withhold justice from the oppressed of my people

In the fourth century AD, Augustine of Hippo said "for I think a law that is not just, is not actually a law" ("nam mihi lex esse non videtur, quae justa non fuerit"). He wrote this when discussing why evil exists; his conclusion was that it is ultimately a problem caused by people departing from good or just behavior.

Thomas Aquinas exhaustively examines the legitimacy of man-made laws and whether they should be obeyed, in Summa Theologica. He asks "do man-made laws have to be obeyed?" His answer is no; a law only need to be obeyed if it is legitimate in three ways:

1. The Purpose: The law must be for the common good.
2. The Author: It must be in the scope of the authority making the law.
3. The Form: And its burden should be equal and apply to all.

Aquinas says that the disobedience should not itself cause harm or lead people into evil. He refers to Isaiah establishing that it is always lawful to avoid oppression.

In the essay Civil Disobedience (1849), Henry David Thoreau also called into question the legitimacy of any law that was unjust. He says:

“Unjust laws exist:
shall we be content to obey them,
or shall we endeavor to amend them,
and obey them until we have succeeded,
or shall we transgress them at once?”

Martin Luther King Jr, in Letter from Birmingham Jail, referred to both Augustine and Aquinas, saying that Jim Crow laws were unjust and should be eschewed, in establishing his rationale for the goodness of civil disobedience.

=== India ===
In Indian philosophy, the idea that a rule is not a "true law" unless it is based on the idea of Ṛta, a possible cognate for "right" in English. This natural law foundation establishes rules for what is a "law" or "truth", a form of order so high that even the gods themselves must obey or be in the wrong. They do not govern Ṛta, but manifest it through their ordinances and retributions, their rewards and punishments. They don't "govern" it; they serve it as agents and ministers.

== See also ==
- History of human rights
- Radbruch formula – Legal theory first formulated in 1946
- No True Scotsman – Logical fallacy

== Sources ==
- Law and Morality, Edited by Kenneth Einar Himma, Seattle Pacific University, U.S. and Brian Bix, University of Minnesota, U.S.
- Philosophical theory and the Universal Declaration of Human Rights, William Sweet (ed.).
