= Olaf Tollefsen =

American philosopher

- Born: March 4, 1944
- Died: September 13, 1989 (aged 45)
- Spouse: Maureen Elizabeth Foley
- Children: 4 boys (Christopher, Eric, Ian, and John); 3 girls (Jenna, Sarah, and Maurya)
- Parent(s): Olaf Tollefsen, Frances Tollefsen

Education
- Education: Georgetown University (PhD), University of Scranton (BA)
- Thesis: Verification Procedures in Dialectical Metaphysics (1970)
- Doctoral advisor: Germain Grisez

Philosophical work
- Era: 21st-century philosophy
- Region: Western philosophy
- Institutions: St. Anselm College, Mount St. Mary's College (Emmitsburg, Maryland)
- Main interests: ethics, aesthetics, philosophy of science
- Notable ideas: new natural law theory

Olaf P. Tollefsen (March 4, 1944 – September 13, 1989) was an American philosopher and Professor of Philosophy at St. Anselm College. He is known for his works on aesthetics, ethics and the philosophy of science.

== Books ==
- Free Choice: A Self-Referential Argument, with Joseph Boyle and Germain Grisez, Notre Dame: University of Notre Dame Press 1979
- Foundationalism Defended: Essays on Epistemology, Ethics, and Aesthetics, St Anselm College 1994
