= Lon L. Fuller =

American philosopher of law (1902–1978)

- Born: Lon Luvois Fuller; June 15, 1902; Hereford, Texas, U.S.
- Died: April 8, 1978 (aged 75); Cambridge, Massachusetts, U.S.

Education
- Education: Stanford University (BA, LLB)

Philosophical work
- Era: 20th-century philosophy
- Region: Western philosophy
- School: Analytic philosophy Natural law theory
- Institutions: Harvard University
- Main interests: Legal philosophy
- Notable ideas: The internal morality of law

Lon Luvois Fuller (June 15, 1902 – April 8, 1978) was an American legal philosopher best known as a proponent of a secular and procedural form of natural law theory. Fuller was a professor of law at Harvard Law School for many years, and is noted in American law for his contributions to both jurisprudence and the law of contracts. His 1958 debate with the British legal philosopher H. L. A. Hart in the Harvard Law Review (the Hart–Fuller debate) was important in framing the modern conflict between legal positivism and natural law theory. In his widely discussed 1964 book The Morality of Law, Fuller argues that all systems of law contain an "internal morality" that imposes on individuals a presumptive obligation of obedience. Robert S. Summers said in 1984: "Fuller was one of the four most important American legal theorists of the last hundred years". (Note: Summers's other three were Oliver Wendell Holmes Jr., Roscoe Pound and Karl Llewellyn.)

== Life ==
Fuller was born in Hereford, Texas and grew up in the Imperial Valley in Southern California. He went to Stanford University as an undergraduate and for law school. He taught at the University of Oregon School of Law, then at Duke University School of Law, where one of his students was future US president Richard Nixon. In 1940, he joined Harvard Law School, and was elevated to the Carter chair of jurisprudence in 1948. He remained at Harvard until retiring in 1972. He also practiced law with the firm of Ropes, Gray, Best, Coolidge & Rugg at Boston, where he worked in labor arbitration. At Harvard, he taught both contract law and jurisprudence, and pushed to reform the pedagogical approach of the law faculty.

Fuller died at age 75 at his home in Cambridge, Massachusetts. He was survived by his wife, Marjorie, two children from a previous marriage – F. Brock Fuller and Cornelia F. Hopfield – and two stepchildren, William D. Chapple and Mimi Hinnawi. He had eight grandchildren.

== The internal morality of law ==
In his 1958 debate with Hart and more fully in The Morality of Law (1964), Fuller sought to steer a middle course between traditional natural law theory and legal positivism. Like most legal academics of his day, Fuller rejected traditional religious forms of natural law theory, which view human law as rooted in a rationally knowable and universally binding "higher law" that derives from God. Fuller accepted the idea, found in the writings of some traditional natural law theorists, that in some cases unjust laws or legal systems are not law. In his famous "Reply to Professor Hart", part of the Hart–Fuller debate, he wrote:

I would like to ask the reader whether he can actually share Professor Hart's indignation that, in the perplexities of the postwar re-construction, the German courts saw fit to declare this thing not a law. Can it be argued seriously that it would have been more beseeming to the judicial process if the postwar courts had undertaken a study of "the interpretative principles" in force during Hitler's rule and had then solemnly applied those "principles" to ascertain the meaning of this statute? On the other hand, would the courts really have been showing respect for Nazi law if they had constructed the Nazi statutes on their own, quite different, standards of interpretation? (p. 655)

Professor Hart castigates the German courts and Radbruch, not so much for what they believed had to be done, but because they failed to see that they were confronted by a moral dilemma of a sort that would have been immediately apparent to Bentham and Austin. By the simple dodge of saying, "When a statute is sufficiently evil it ceases to be law," they ran away from the problem they should have faced. This criticism is, I believe, without justification. So far as the courts are concerned, matters certainly would not have been helped if, instead of saying, "This is not law," they had said, "This is law but it is so evil we will refuse to apply it." (p. 655)

To me there is nothing shocking in saying that a dictatorship which clothes itself with a tinsel of legal form can so far depart from the morality of order, from the inner morality of law itself, that it ceases to be a legal system. When a system calling itself law is predicated upon a general disregard by judges of the terms of the laws they purport to enforce, when this system habitually cures its legal irregularities, even the grossest, by retroactive statutes, when it has only to resort to forays of terror in the streets, which no one dares challenge, in order to escape even those scant restraints imposed by the pretence of legality - when all these things have become true of a dictatorship, it is not hard for me, at least, to deny to it the name of law. (p. 660)

Fuller also denied the core claim of legal positivism that there is no necessary connection between law and morality. According to Fuller, certain moral standards, which he calls "principles of legality," are built into the very concept of law, so that nothing counts as genuine law that fails to meet these standards. In virtue of these principles of legality, the law has an inner morality that imposes a minimal morality of fairness. Some laws, he admits, may be so wicked or unjust that they should not be obeyed. But even in these cases, he argues, there are positive features of the law that impose a defensible moral duty to obey them.

According to Fuller, all purported legal rules must meet eight minimal conditions in order to count as genuine laws. The rules must be (1) sufficiently general, (2) publicly promulgated, (3) prospective (i.e., applicable only to future behavior, not past), (4) at least minimally clear and intelligible, (5) free of contradictions, (6) relatively constant, so that they don't continuously change from day to day, (7) possible to obey, and (8) administered in a way that does not wildly diverge from their obvious or apparent meaning. These are Fuller's "principles of legality." Together, he argues, they guarantee that all law will embody certain moral standards of respect, fairness, and predictability that constitute important aspects of the rule of law.

Fuller presents these issues in The Morality of Law with a story about an imaginary king named Rex who attempts to rule but finds he is unable to do so in any meaningful way when any of these conditions are not met. Fuller contends that the purpose of law is to subject "human conduct to the governance of rules". If any of the eight principles is flagrantly lacking in a system of governance, the system will not be a legal one. The more closely a system is able to adhere to them, the nearer it will be to the rule-of-law ideal, though in reality all systems must make compromises and will fall short of perfect ideals of clarity, consistency, stability, and so forth.

In a review of The Morality of Law, Hart criticises Fuller's work, saying that these principles are merely ones of means-ends efficiency; it is inappropriate, he says, to call them a morality. Employing Fuller's eight principles of legality, one could just as well have an inner morality of poisoning as an inner morality of law, which Hart claims is absurd. In this phase of the argument, the positions of the disputants are transposed. Fuller proposes principles that would easily fit into a positivistic account of law and Hart points out that Fuller's principles could easily accommodate an immoral morality.

Other critics have challenged Fuller's claim that there is a prima facie obligation to obey all laws. Some laws, it is claimed, are so unjust and oppressive that there is not even a presumptive moral duty to obey them.

In 1954 Fuller proposed the term eunomics to describe "the science, theory or study of good order and workable arrangements". Stemming from behavioral systems theory, it was an attempt to fuse what Fuller saw as the inherent morality of law with the empirical data and methods of the objective sciences. Its main practical application appears to be as a form of industrial dispute resolution.

== Works ==
- Law in Quest of Itself, 1940
- Basic Contract Law, 1947 (second edition, 1964)
- Problems of Jurisprudence, 1949
- The Morality of Law, 1964 (second edition, 1969)
- Legal Fictions, 1967
- Anatomy of Law, 1968

== See also ==
- "The Case of the Speluncean Explorers", an essay published by Fuller in 1949
- Hart–Fuller debate
- Rule of law
