= Radbruch formula =

Legal theory first formulated in 1946

The Radbruch formula (German: Radbruchsche Formel) is a legal theory which was first formulated in a 1946 essay by the German law professor and politician Gustav Radbruch. According to the theory, a judge who encounters a conflict between a statute and what he perceives as just, has to decide against applying the statute if—and only if—the legal concept behind the statute in question seems either "unbearably unjust" or in "deliberate disregard" of human equality before the law.

Radbruch's formula is rooted in the situation of a civil law system. Radbruch devised the formula following his experience of the judiciary in Nazi Germany, and it has been applied in the decision of courts in the Federal Republic of Germany numerous times. His 1946 essay Gesetzliches Unrecht und übergesetzliches Recht ("Statutory Lawlessness and Supra-Statutory Law"), which first included his theory, has been regarded as one of the most influential German legal-philosophical writings of the 20th century.

The Radbruch formula has a number of historical antecedents, such as Saint Augustine's maxim "an unjust law is no law at all".

== Formation and content ==
Before the Second World War, Radbruch seems to have been a supporter of unconditional legal positivism, which demands a strict separation between law and morality. In consequence, judges would have to apply positive law (i.e. statutes) without exception. His experience under Nazi rule (Radbruch, then a professor, was banned from teaching) seems to have modified his view. Shortly after the end of the war, Radbruch first stated his formula in a 1946 essay:

The conflict between justice and legal certainty may well be resolved in this way: The positive law, secured by pronouncement and power, takes precedence even when its content is unjust (ungerecht) and fails in its purpose of benefitting the people, unless the conflict between positive statute and justice reaches such an intolerable degree that the statute, as 'flawed law (unrichtiges Recht)’ must yield to justice. It is impossible to draw a sharper line between cases of statutory lawlessness (gesetzliches Unrecht) and statutes (Gesetze) that are valid in spite of their flawed content. Another line of distinction, however, can be traced with utmost clarity: Where there is not even an attempt at justice, where equality, which forms the core of justice, is deliberately betrayed in the laying down of positive law, then the statute is not even merely 'flawed law'—rather, it lacks completely the very nature of law. For law, including positive law, cannot be otherwise defined than as a system and an institution whose very meaning is to serve justice. Measured by this standard, whole portions of National Socialist law never attained the dignity of valid law (zur Würde geltendes Recht).

== Application in court ==
Both the German Federal Constitutional Court and the Federal Court of Justice have applied Radbruch's formula numerous times. Its first court appearances were in cases concerned with National Socialist crimes. The defendants in those cases argued that, according to Nazi statutes valid at the time of their acts, those acts had been legal. The courts used Radbruch's formula to argue that some statutes were so intolerable that they had not been law in the first place and consequently could not be used to justify the acts in question.

More recently, the Radbruch formula reappeared in trials against border guards in the former East Germany who had shot people attempting to escape to the West under the policy of Schießbefehl.
