= Analytical jurisprudence =

Theory of jurisprudence

Analytical jurisprudence is a philosophical approach to law that draws on the resources of modern analytical philosophy to try to understand the nature of law. It is a branch of jurisprudence, which is also called the philosophy of law. Since the boundaries of analytical philosophy are somewhat vague, it is difficult to say how far it extends. H. L. A. Hart is the most influential writer in the history of modern analytical jurisprudence, though the analytical approach to jurisprudence goes back at least to Jeremy Bentham.

Analytical jurisprudence is not to be mistaken for legal formalism (the idea that legal reasoning is or can be modelled as a mechanical, algorithmic process). Indeed, it was the analytical jurists who first pointed out that legal formalism is fundamentally mistaken as a theory of law.

Analytic, or "clarificatory" jurisprudence uses a neutral point of view and descriptive language when referring to aspects of legal systems. It rejects natural law's fusing of what law is and what it ought to be. David Hume famously argued in A Treatise of Human Nature that people invariably slip between describing that the world is a certain way to saying that therefore we ought to engage in a particular course of action. But as a matter of pure logic, one cannot conclude that we ought to do something merely because something is the case. So, analysing and clarifying the way the world is must be treated as a strictly separate from normative and evaluative ought questions.

The most important questions of analytic jurisprudence are: "What are laws?"; "What is the law?"; "What is the relationship between law and power?"; and "What is the relationship between law and morality?"

== See also ==
- Rule of law
- Legality
- Rule according to higher law
