= Luigi Ferrajoli =

Italian jurist (born 1940)

Luigi Ferrajoli (born 6 August 1940) is an Italian jurist and disciple of Norberto Bobbio. Born in Florence, he is one of the leading theorists of garantism (garantismo jurídico in Spanish or simply garantismo in Italian), a theory he initially developed within the field of criminal law but that he regards as a general paradigm applicable to the protection of all fundamental rights. Ferrajoli defines himself as a critical legal positivist, and is also considered a philosopher.

== Selected works ==
Many of Ferrajoli's works have been translated into Spanish by former Supreme Court of Spain justice Perfecto Andrés Ibáñez. His main works include:

- 1995: Law and Reason: Theory of Penal Garantism. Madrid: Editorial Trotta.
- 1999: Rights and Guarantees: The Law of the Weakest. Madrid: Editorial Trotta.
- 2004: Epistemology and Garantism. Mexico City: UNAM.
- 2006: Penal Garantism. Mexico City: UNAM.
- 2007: Principia Iuris: Theory of Law and Democracy. Vol. 1: Theory of Law. Rome–Bari: Editori Laterza.
- 2007: Principia Iuris: Theory of Law and Democracy. Vol. 2: Theory of Democracy. Rome–Bari: Editori Laterza.
- 2007: Principia Iuris: Theory of Law and Democracy. Vol. 3: The Syntax of Law. Rome–Bari: Editori Laterza.
- 2008: The Theory of Law in the System of Legal Knowledge. In: Ferrajoli, L.; Atienza, M.; Moreso, J. The Theory of Law in the Constitutional Paradigm. Madrid: Fundación Coloquio Jurídico Europeo.
- 2008: Democracy and Garantism. Madrid: Editorial Trotta.
- 2012: Twelve Questions around Principia iuris. Eunomía. Journal on the Culture of Legality. No. 1, September 2011–February 2012.
- 2017: Constitutionalism Beyond the State. Spanish edition: Constitucionalismo más allá del Estado (Trotta, 2018).
- 2019: Manifesto for Equality. Madrid: Editorial Trotta.
- 2022: For an Earth Constitution: Humanity at the Crossroads. Madrid: Editorial Trotta. (Per una Costituzione della Terra. L'umanità al bivio)
