= Pierre Schlag =

Pierre Schlag (born March 3, 1954) is a legal theorist and the Byron R. White Professor at the University of Colorado Law School. Generally associated with the critical legal studies movement and school of legal thought, his contributions to the modern legal canon have primarily focused on the subjects of aesthetics and the law, Constitutional interpretation, deconstruction, subjectivity, and broader 'meta' critiques of legal institutions, publications, and thought. He is also the author of a work of fiction, American Absurd.
