= Postmodern law =

Legal theory based on postmodernism

Postmodern law and postmodern jurisprudence relates to interpretations of the legal system using postmodern philosophy and the theories of postmodernism. It also relevant to law within the context of the postmodern era. Since the mid-1990s Annual meetings of the Association of American Law Schools have focused on the inclusion of postmodern interpretative strategies at these meetings. Postmodern interpretations of the law can involve critically considering legal inequalities connected to gender, class, race and ethnicity by acknowledging "diversity and multiplicity". Critical practices connected to postmodern philosophy, such as critical literacy and deconstruction, can be used as an interpretative tool to ensure that a range of different and diverse values and norms are acknowledged or considered.

== See also ==
- Critical legal studies
