= New natural law =

School of natural law ethics

New Natural Law (NNL) theory or New Classical Natural Law theory is an approach to natural law ethics and jurisprudence based on a reinterpretation of the writings of Thomas Aquinas. The approach began in the 1960s with the work of Germain Grisez and has since been developed by John Finnis, Robert P. George, Joseph Boyle, Olaf Tollefsen, Christopher Tollefsen and others. NNL theory typically relies on a concept of 'basic goods'.
