= Gustav Radbruch =

German legal scholar and politician (1878–1949)

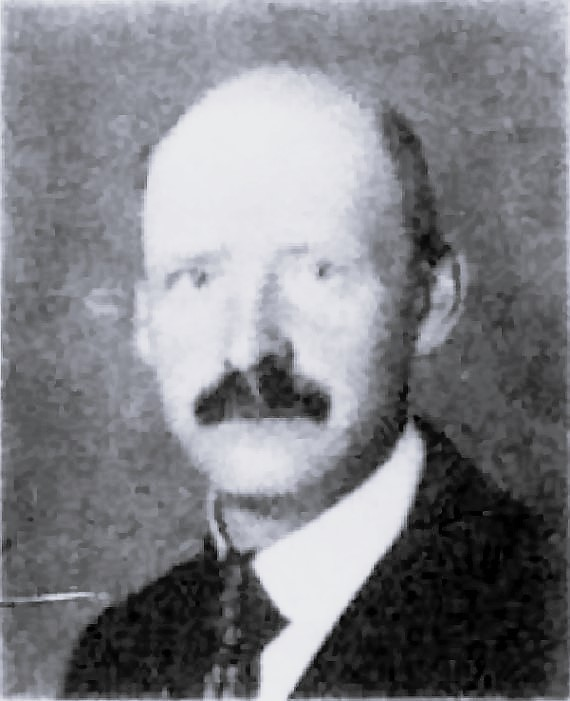

Reich Minister of Justice
- In office 13 August 1923 – 23 November 1923
- Chancellor: Gustav Stresemann
- Preceded by: Rudolf Heinze
- Succeeded by: Erich Emminger
- In office 26 October 1921 – 22 November 1922
- Chancellor: Joseph Wirth
- Preceded by: Eugen Schiffer
- Succeeded by: Rudolf Heinze

Member of the Reichstag
- In office 24 June 1920 – 13 March 1924
- Constituency: National list

Personal details
- Born: 21 November 1878 Free City of Lübeck, German Empire
- Died: 23 November 1949 (aged 71) Heidelberg, Württemberg-Baden, West Germany
- Party: Social Democratic Party
- Education: Friedrich Wilhelm University of Berlin; Heidelberg University
- Profession: Lawyer, legal philosopher

Gustav Radbruch (German: [ˈʁaːtbʁʊx]; 21 November 1878 – 23 November 1949) was a German legal scholar and politician. He served as Minister of Justice of Germany during the early Weimar period. Radbruch is also regarded as one of the most influential legal philosophers of the 20th century.

== Life ==
Born in Lübeck, Radbruch studied law at the Ludwig-Maximilians-Universität München, Leipzig University, and the Friedrich Wilhelm University of Berlin. He passed his first bar exam ("Staatsexamen") in Berlin in 1901, and the following year he received his doctorate with a dissertation on "The Theory of Adequate Causation". This was followed in 1903 by his qualification to teach criminal law at Heidelberg University. In 1904, he was appointed Professor of criminal and trial law and legal philosophy at Heidelberg University. In 1914, he accepted a call to a professorship at the University of Königsberg, and later that year assumed a professorship at Kiel University.

Radbruch was a member of the Social Democratic Party of Germany (SPD), and held a seat in the Reichstag from 1920 to 1924. From 1921 to 1922 and throughout 1923, he was minister of justice in the cabinets of Joseph Wirth and Gustav Stresemann. During his time in office, a number of important laws were implemented, such as those giving women access to the justice system, and, after the assassination of Foreign Minister Walther Rathenau, the Law for the Protection of the Republic, which increased the punishments for politically motivated acts of violence and banned organizations that opposed the "constitutional republican form of government" along with their printed matter and meetings.

In 1926, Radbruch accepted a renewed call to lecture at Heidelberg where he delivered his inaugural lecture entitled "Der Mensch im Recht (Law's Image of the Human)" as the newly appointed Professor of Criminal Law on 13 November 1926. After the Nazi seizure of power in January 1933, Radbruch, as a former Social Democratic politician, was dismissed from his university post under the terms of the so-called "Law for the Restoration of the Professional Civil Service" ("Gesetz zur Wiederherstellung des Berufsbeamtentums"), as universities, similar to public bodies, were subject to civil service laws and regulations. Despite the employment ban in Nazi Germany, during 1935/36 he was able to spend a year in England, at University College, Oxford. An important practical outcome of this was his book, Der Geist des englischen Rechts (The Spirit of English Law), although this could be published only in 1945. During the Nazi period, he devoted himself primarily to cultural-historical work.

Immediately after the end of the Second World War in 1945, he resumed his teaching activities, but died in Heidelberg in 1949 without being able to complete his planned updated edition of his textbook on legal philosophy.

In September 1945, Radbruch published a short paper "Fünf Minuten Rechtsphilosophie" (Five Minutes of Legal Philosophy), which was influential in shaping the jurisprudence of values (Wertungsjurisprudenz), prevalent in the aftermath of World War II as a reaction against legal positivism.

== Work ==
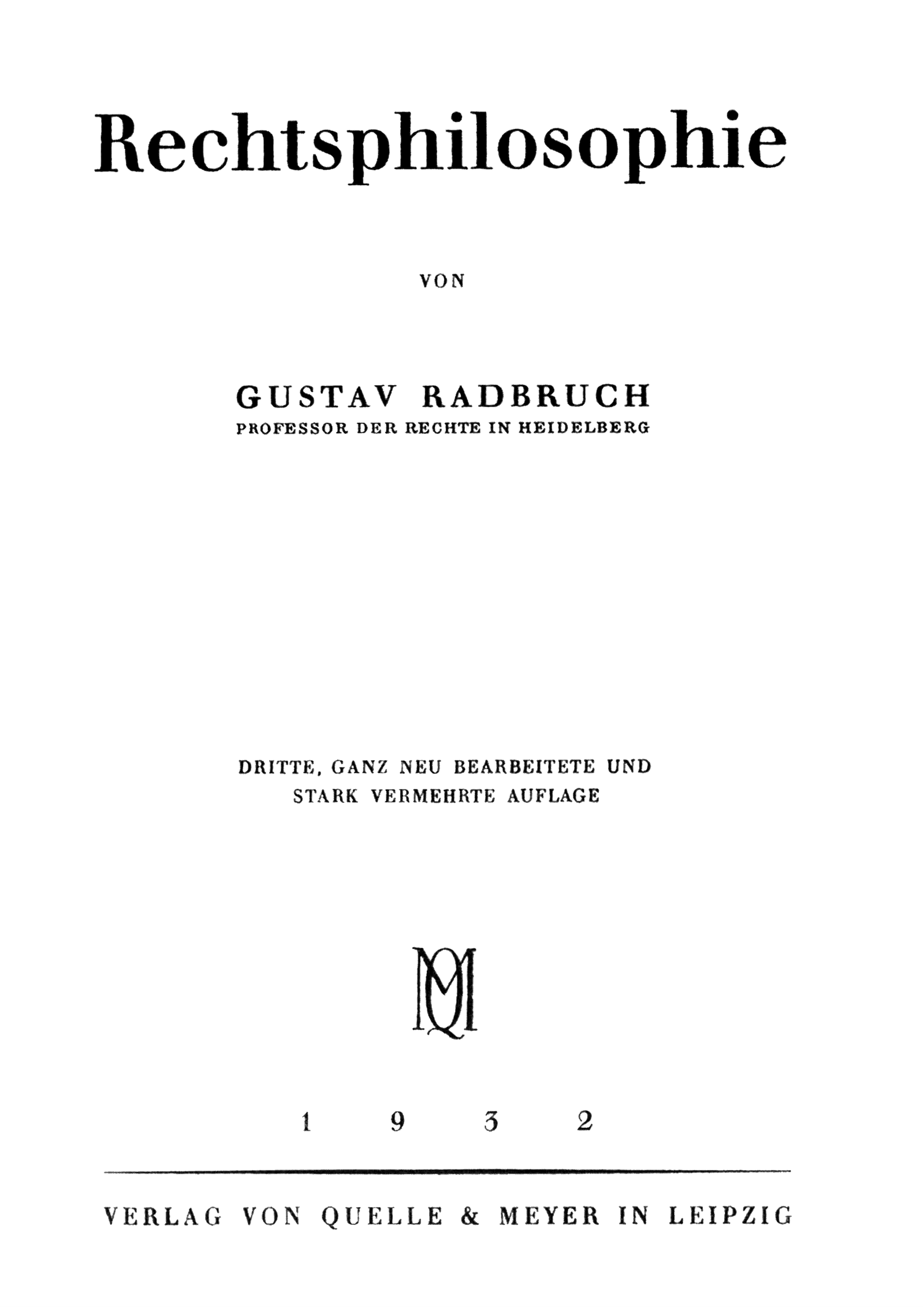
Title page of Rechtsphilosophie (1932)

Radbruch's legal philosophy derived from neo-Kantianism, which assumes that a categorical cleavage exists between "is" (sein) and "ought" (sollen). According to this view, "should" can never be derived from "Being." Indicative of the Heidelberg school of neo-Kantianism to which Radbruch subscribed was that it interpolated the value-related cultural studies between the explanatory sciences (being) and philosophical teachings of values (should).

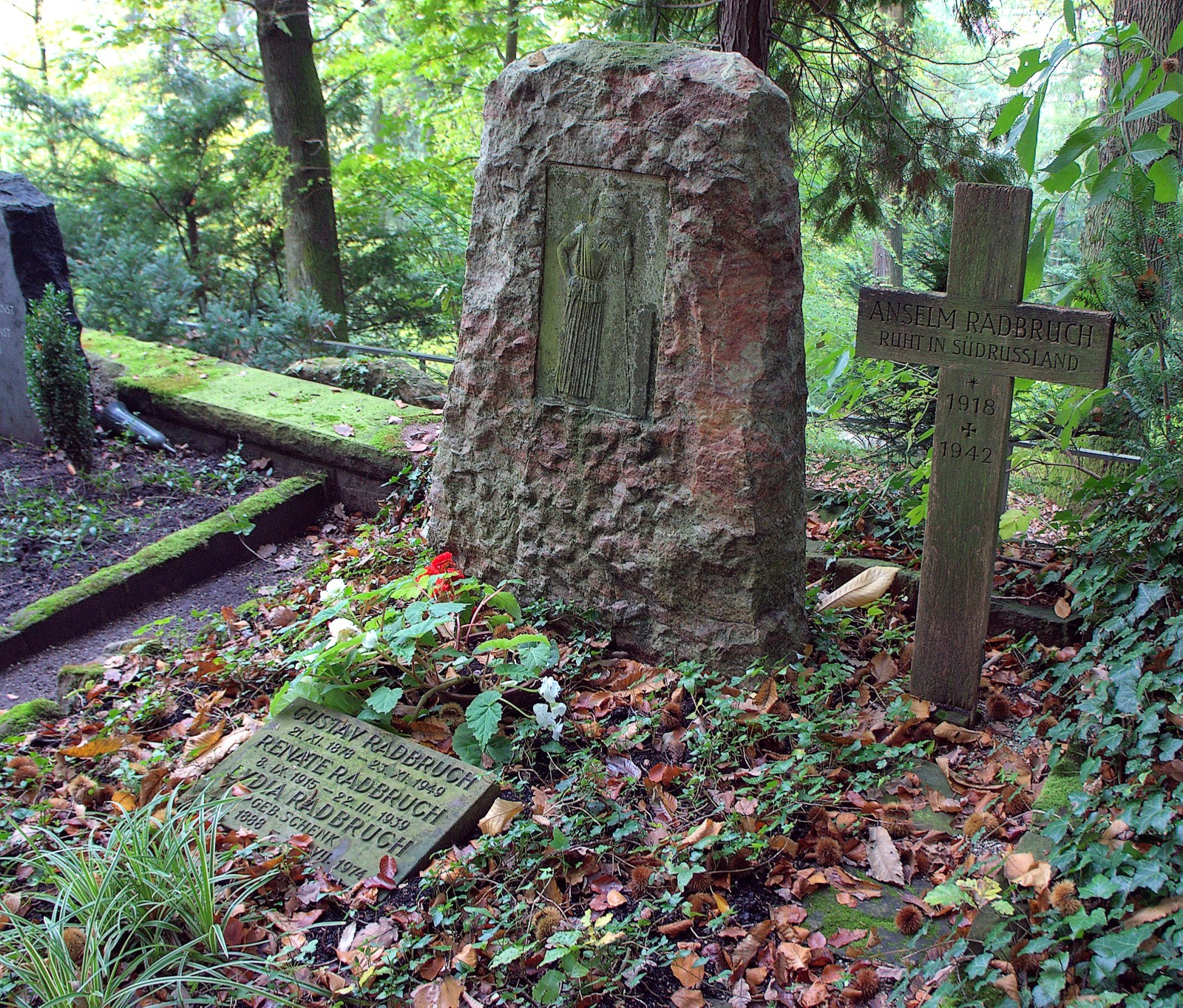
Radbruch's grave in Heidelberg

In relation to the law, this triadism shows itself in the subfields of legal sociology, legal philosophy and legal dogma. Legal dogma assumes a place in between. It posits itself in opposition to positive law, as the latter depicts itself in social reality and methodologically in the objective "should-have" sense of law, which reveals itself through value-related interpretation.

The core of Radbruch's legal philosophy consists of his tenets the concept of law and the idea of law. The idea of law is defined through a triad of justice, utility and certainty. Radbruch thereby had the idea of utility or usefulness spring forth from an analysis of the idea of justice. Upon this notion was based the Radbruch formula, which is still vigorously debated today. The concept of law, for Radbruch, is "nothing other than the given fact, which has the sense to serve the idea of law".

Hotly disputed is the question whether Radbruch was a legal positivist before 1933 and executed an about-face in his thinking due to the advent of Nazism, or whether he continued to develop, under the impression of Nazi crimes, the relativistic values-teaching he had already been advocating before 1933.

The problem of the controversy between the spirit and the letter of the law, in Germany, has been brought back to public attention due to the trials of former East German soldiers who guarded the Berlin Wall—the so-called necessity of following orders.

In sum, Radbruch's formula argues that where statutory law is incompatible with the requirements of justice "to an intolerable degree", or where statutory law was obviously designed in a way that deliberately negates "the equality that is the core of all justice", statutory law must be disregarded by a judge in favour of the justice principle. Since its first publication in 1946 the principle has been accepted by Germany's Federal Constitutional Court in a variety of cases. Many people partially blame the older German legal tradition of legal positivism for the ease with which Hitler obtained power in an outwardly "legal" manner, rather than by means of a coup. Arguably, the shift to a concept of natural law ought to act as a safeguard against dictatorship, an untrammeled State power and the abrogation of civil rights.
