= Christopher Tollefsen =

American philosopher

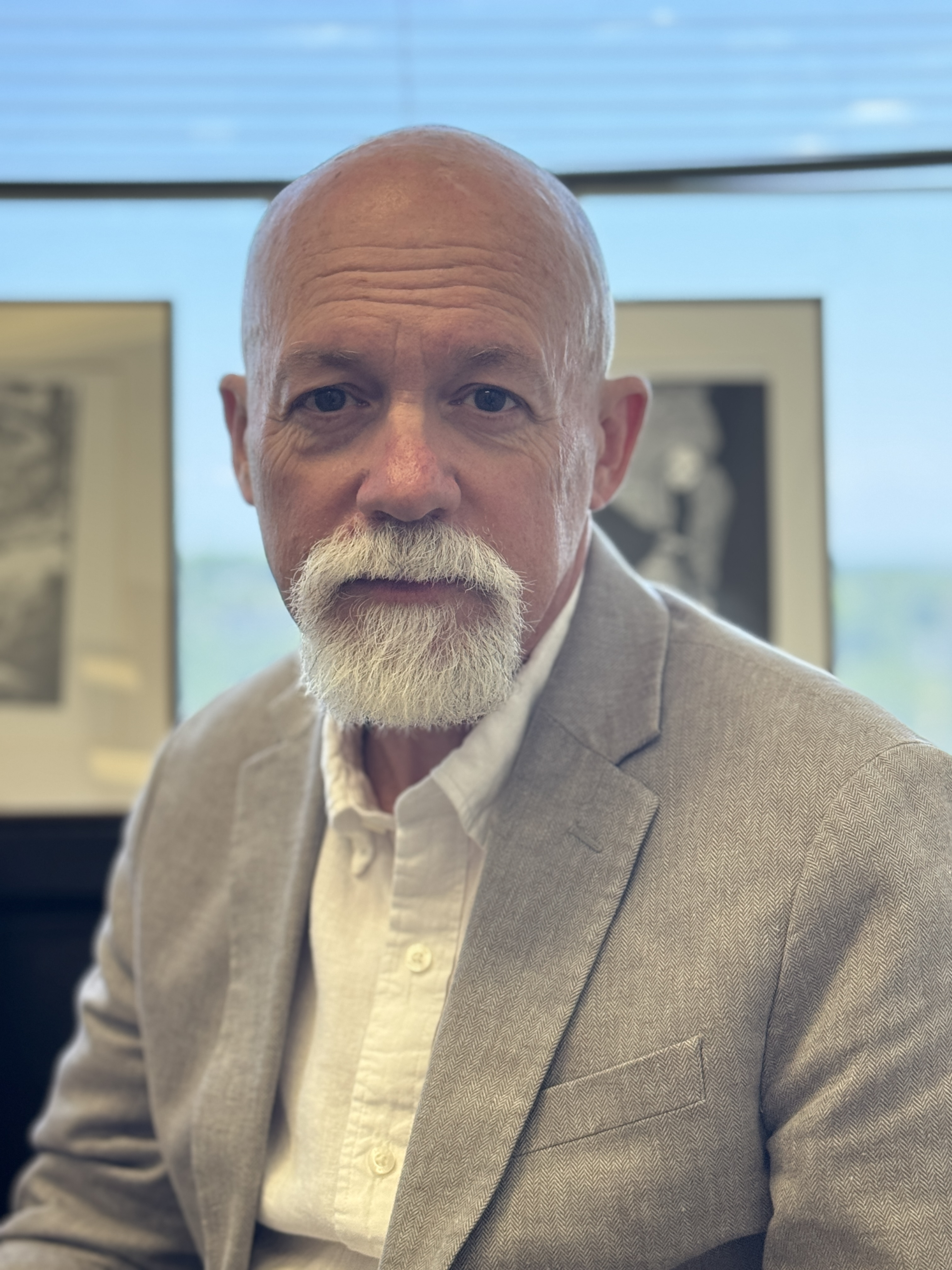
- Born: January 25, 1968 (age 58)
- Parent(s): Olaf Tollefsen, Maureen Elizabeth Foley

Education
- Education: Emory University (PhD), St. Anselm College (BA)

Philosophical work
- Era: 21st-century philosophy
- Region: Western philosophy
- Institutions: University of South Carolina
- Main interests: ethics

Christopher Olaf Tollefsen (born 1968) is an American philosopher and Professor of Philosophy, and the Peter McCausland Chair in Civic Engagement at the University of South Carolina. He is the Executive Director of the South Carolina Center for American Civic Leadership and Public Discourse. He is known for his works on ethics. Tollefsen is a member of the Fellowship of Catholic Scholars and much of his work focuses on Catholic philosophical subjects.

== Books ==
- Killing and Christian Ethics, Cambridge University Press, 2026
- The Way of Medicine: Ethics and the Healing Profession, with Farr Curlin, University of Notre Dame Press, 2021
- Lying and Christian Ethics, Cambridge University Press, 2014
- Biomedical Research and Beyond: Expanding the Ethics of Inquiry, Routledge, 2008; paperback 2010.
- Embryo: A Defense of Human Life, with Robert P. George; Doubleday, 2008; 2nd ed., Witherspoon Institute in 2012.

=== Edited ===
- Natural Law Ethics in Theory and Practice: A Joseph Boyle Reader, edited with John Liptay, Catholic University of America Press, 2020.
- Bioethics With Liberty and Justice: Themes in the Work of Joseph M. Boyle, Springer, 2011.
- Artificial Nutrition and Hydration: The New Catholic Debate, Springer, 2008.
- John Paul II’s Contribution to Catholic Bioethics, Springer, 2004.
