= Germain Grisez =

French-American Catholic philosophers (1929–2018)

Germain Gabriel Grisez (September 30, 1929 – February 1, 2018) was a French-American philosopher. Grisez's development of ideas from Thomas Aquinas has redirected Catholic thought and changed the way it has engaged with secular moral philosophy. In 'The First Principle of Practical Reason: A Commentary on the Summa Theologiae, I-II, Q. 94, A. 2' (1965), Grisez attacked the neo-scholastic interpretation of Aquinas as holding that moral norms are derived from methodologically antecedent knowledge of human nature. Grisez defended the idea of metaphysical free choice and proposed a natural law theory of practical reasoning and moral judgment which, although broadly Thomistic, departs from Aquinas on significant points.

Grisez was Professor of Christian Ethics at Mount St. Mary's University in Emmitsburg, MD from 1979 to his retirement in 2009.

== See also ==
- John Finnis
- Robert P. George
- Pontifical Commission on Birth Control#Minority report
- New Natural Law
