= John Finnis =

Australian legal scholar and philosopher (born 1940)

John Finnis AC CBE KC (Hon) FBA
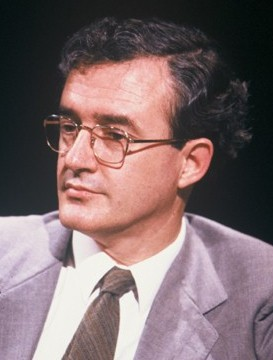
- Finnis on After Dark, 1987
- Born: John Mitchell Finnis; 28 July 1940 (age 86); Adelaide, South Australia, Australia

Education
- Education: University of Adelaide (LLB); University College, Oxford (DPhil)
- Thesis: The Idea of Judicial Power, with Special Reference to Australian Law (1965)
- Doctoral advisor: H. L. A. Hart

Philosophical work
- Era: Contemporary philosophy
- Region: Western philosophy
- School: Thomism; Natural law theory
- Institutions: University of Oxford
- Doctoral students: Neil Gorsuch; Robert P. George
- Main interests: Philosophy of law; Political theory; Philosophy of religion
- Notable works: Natural Law and Natural Rights (1980, 2011)
- Notable ideas: Criticism of legal positivism

John Mitchell Finnis AC CBE KC (Hon) FBA (born 28 July 1940) is an Australian legal philosopher and jurist specializing in jurisprudence and the philosophy of law. He is an original interpreter of Aristotle and Aquinas, and counts Germain Grisez as a major influence and collaborator. He has made contributions to epistemology, metaphysics, and moral philosophy.

Finnis was Professor of Law and Legal Philosophy at the University of Oxford from 1989 to 2010, where he is now Professor of Law and Legal Philosophy Emeritus. He is also the Biolchini Family Professor of Law, emeritus, at Notre Dame Law School and a permanent senior distinguished research fellow at Notre Dame's de Nicola Center for Ethics and Culture. He acted as adviser to several Australian State governments, especially Queensland and Western Australia, mostly on the States' relations with the federal Government and with the United Kingdom.

His practice at the English Bar saw him in cases in the High Court and in the Court of Appeal. He is a member of Gray's Inn. He was appointed an honorary Queen's Counsel in 2017. In the 2019 Queen's Birthday Honours for Australia, Finnis was appointed a Companion in the General Division of the Order of Australia, the country's highest civilian honour, for his eminent service as a jurist and legal scholar. He was appointed Commander of the Order of the British Empire (CBE) in the 2023 New Year Honours for services to legal scholarship.

He has supervised several doctoral students including U.S. Supreme Court Justice Neil Gorsuch, Justice Susan Kenny of the Federal Court of Australia, Robert P. George of Princeton University, and John Keown of Georgetown University. In 2013 George and Keown summarised some of Finnis's media work as "He has, for example, debated embryo research with Mary Warnock on BBC's Newsnight and with Jonathan Glover in the Channel 4 Debate; discussed euthanasia with a leading Dutch euthanasiast on the same channel's After Dark, and written on eugenic abortion in The Sunday Telegraph".

== Early life and education ==
Finnis was educated at St Peter's College, Adelaide, and the University of Adelaide, where he was a member of St Mark's College. He obtained his Bachelor of Laws (LL.B.) degree there in 1961. In 1962, Finnis won a Rhodes scholarship to University College, Oxford, in where he obtained his Doctor of Philosophy degree in 1965 with a thesis on the concept of judicial power, with reference to Australian federal constitutional law. Also in 1962, Finnis converted to Roman Catholicism.

Finnis is a friend of Aung San Suu Kyi, also an Oxford graduate, and, in 1989, nominated her for the Nobel Peace Prize. Aung San Suu Kyi won the prize but did not receive it until June 2012, when she recalled how her late husband, Michael Aris, had visited her under house arrest and brought her the news "that a friend, John Finnis" had nominated her for the prize.

== Publications ==
Finnis is an author of several philosophical works. His best known work is Natural Law and Natural Rights (1980, 2011), a seminal contribution to the philosophy of law and a restatement of natural law doctrine. For Finnis there are eight basic goods; life, knowledge, play, aesthetic experience, sociability of friendship, practical reasonableness, religion and marriage. His Fundamentals of Ethics collect six Carroll Lectures Finnis delivered at Georgetown University in 1982. He has published five collections of essays: Reason in Action, Intention and Identity, Human Rights and Common Good, Philosophy of Law, Religion and Public Reasons. Below is a complete list of his publications.

- Natural Law and Natural Rights, Oxford: Clarendon Press, 1980; 2nd ed., 2011. ISBN 978-0-19-959913-4.
- Fundamentals of Ethics, Washington D.C.: Georgetown University Press, 1983. ISBN 978-0-87840-408-7.
- Nuclear Deterrence, Morality, and Realism, with J. M. Boyle Jr. and Germain Grisez, Oxford: Clarendon Press, 1987. ISBN 978-0-19-824791-3.
- Natural Law, 2 vols (as editor), New York: New York University Press, 1991. ISBN 978-0-8147-2603-7 and ISBN 978-0-8147-2604-4.
- Moral Absolutes: Tradition, Revision and Truth, Washington D.C.: Catholic University of America Press, 1991. ISBN 978-0-8132-0745-2.
- Aquinas: Moral, Political, and Legal Theory, Oxford: Oxford University Press, 1998. ISBN 978-0-19-878085-4.
- The Collected Essays of John Finnis, 5 vols, Oxford and New York: Oxford University Press, 2011. ISBN 978-0-19-968993-4.

== Selected contributions ==
=== Introduction ===
A unifying theme running through Finnis' writings is the importance he attributes to human freedom, as the ability to make decisions about the kind of life one wants to live. Such decisions involve choices among incommensurable basic goods, which practical reason must order to achieve desired ends. A mature exercise of freedom would avoid intentionally infringing any of the basic goods, and would in different ways and to different extents, foster their realization. At the collective level, we find a similar logic guiding the making of Laws (Natural Law and Natural Rights) and political decisions. In view of this, the discussion has been largely structured around notions of intentionality, prudence, moral choices, and notions of fairness. The discussion on Religion appeals to wider considerations. This is followed by a brief discussion of Finnis's Philosophy of Law. The last section summarises the epistemological and ontological underpinnings of Finnis' philosophy, as captured in his Fundamentals of Ethics.

=== Morality ===
On the basis of experience of facts, possibilities and outcomes, one easily understands basic forms of human good as good for oneself and other human beings, and one's will is fundamentally one's response to this understanding. "Ought" does not follow from "is", since the first principles of practical reasoning are not deduced logically but are understood immediately by the intellect. Morality is a consequence of reflecting on the basic goods as a whole and their implications for human flourishing. Finnis dismisses David Hume's identification of morality as a sentiment of sympathy leading to approbation or disapprobation, by noting that Hume also expected such sentiments to be recognised and agreed to by others. Thus, Hume's morality is based on reasonableness rather than sympathy, notwithstanding "Hume's formal and vigorous protestations to the contrary". Finnis identifies reasonableness with the disinterested and impartial perspective which seeks to understand what is best for everyone at a certain point in time. According to Finnis, Ludwig Wittgenstein "wavers on one of the central matters in issue in his meditations", since propositions of empirical fact are not necessarily true. Yet, Finnis defends the self-evidence of truth using formal logic by appealing to "retorsive arguments".

=== Intention ===
Finnis' writings evidence a keen concern to protect the individual from abuse by the institution, by highlighting the preeminence of the individual's subjectivity. Thus, using Plato's dialogue of the Gorgias, Finnis argues (against Jürgen Habermas' discourse ethics) that silence is ethical and meaningful since it is a locus of reflection and inner deliberation. He further argues (against extant UK Law) that the courts must distinguish direct intention from unintended side-effects, and cannot impute an intention based simply on foreseeability. "Of course, causing death as an unintended side effect is often an injustice, but that wrong is relative to the circumstances whereas the commandment protecting at least innocent human beings is not" The person who blows up a plane to receive the insurance money thereby killing the pilot, may not have intended to kill the pilot even if the pilot's death was foreseeable. On the other hand, Finnis charges with moral and legal responsibility anyone who consents to doing something conditionally on something else happening (preparatory intention) – as in the UK policy on nuclear deterrence, which includes the possibility of targeting civil populations in the event of a nuclear attack on UK cities.

Finnis argues that Veritatis Splendor requires the adoption by the moralist of the perspective of the acting person. The implication is that no act is intrinsically sinful, rather its sinfulness is a function of the acting person's intention, will or purpose (in line with Aquinas' distinction between in genere naturae vs in genere moris). The traditional notion that means are intended in view of the end is thus rejected in favour of the distinction between intended ends (direct effect) and unintended side-effects (indirect effects). This explains, for example, why shooting out of a desire to kill the enemy is wrong whilst simply shooting to defend oneself is not. He further distinguishes between formal (intended) and material cooperation (side effects) in evil; voting for an amendment permitting abortion that has the effect of reducing the availability of abortion is not formal cooperation in the procurement of abortion, but may be material cooperation involving, for example, scandal to third parties. Finnis departs in several ways from Anscombe's understanding of intention.

=== Prudence ===
Finnis notes that Aristotle's discussion of prudence (Phronesis) fails to offer ethical guidance because it is concerned with the selection of means and fails to specify what the ends are; yet, Aquinas' solution of this problem has often been misinterpreted. Ends are the basic goods and prudence is concerned with deliberation both about them and about the means of achieving them, in both cases guided by practical reasoning. Virtue is not simply the outcome of synderesis but it also requires an attraction towards the end and the selection of means. The choice of some basic goods may result in the detriment or even the suppression of others, provided that the latter is not intended. Contraception, abortion and euthanasia are wrong insofar as they involve direct choices against the basic good of life, which they ordinarily do.

Against Leo Strauss and others, Finnis argues that it is wrongful to intentionally take innocent life even in extreme situations in which the very existence of society is at stake. Following Aristotle, Finnis gives great importance to the basic good of friendship in his own deliberation because it involves disinterested love, which goes beyond a mere sense of obligation towards others, and is thus an ideal foundation for morality (contra Philippa Foot); however, this ideal remains imperfect unless it extends to friendship with God as a universalising principle. Finnis argues that eudamonia in Aquinas is the outcome of the harmonious development of all basic goods but that it cannot be achieved in this life (imperfect beautitude).

=== Moral choices ===
By choosing not to become a murderer, Socrates shaped the World in the way he thought best – that it is better to suffer wrong than do it. Any attempt to justify Socrates's choice through looking at foreseeable consequences (consequentialism), or by commensurating good with bad (utilitarianism), or by comparing values with 'disvalues' (proportionalism), fail, as they would all conclude that two murders is worse than one. Kantian arguments also fail because they are concerned with the avoidance of internal contradiction through universalization. But logic cannot explain moral choices, which concern who one wants to be or become. Neither can Kant's claim that 'nature's end' should be respected, since by nature he meant the natural sciences. Finnis notes that Aquinas never sought to resolve moral problems on proportionalist arguments such as the notion of "choosing the lesser evil"; yet, Kant in his "casuistical questions" falls into both intuitionism and consequentialism "like nothing so much as late twentieth-century academic ethics". Finnis claims that utilitarianism appeals to sub-rational desires (happiness, desire, sensible impulse, sensous motives...). Moreover, utilitarianism is not undermined by pluralism, since pluralism is neither concerned with truth or attention to evidence or insight, but rather with opinions – thereby resorting to lust, terror, self-preference or inertia as the basis for decision-making.

=== Fairness ===
Moral decision-making involves seeking integral human fulfilment by responding to "the reasons for action, the practical reasons, that each basic good provides". From this it follows that one must not intentionally do harm to others, or intend evil to achieve good; on the contrary, one must act fairly towards others. Fairness does not involve rational commensuration of goods vs bads; rather it is guided by the Golden Rule through commensuration of alternative options based on "one's own differentiated feelings toward various goods and bads as concretely remembered, experienced, or imagined" in view of integral human fulfilment (cf, the Aristotelian mature person of reasonable character). Analoguously, decisions about what speed to drive on a private road, or whether to have the institution of trusts in English Law, are made by communities not based on rational judgement but on decisions reached as aforesaid. Rival interpretations of the Law can be compared on two dimensions: the fit with the legal materials (e.g., precedent) and moral soundness. Hard cases occur when the best interpretation on fit is different from he best interpretation on moral soundness. Since fit and moral soundness are incommensurable, there cannot be a uniquely right interpretation of the hard case, and the solution must be achieved on the basis of fairness.

=== Religion ===
Religion is a free act to collaborate with God's expectations of our human flourishing. Friedrich Nietzsche's rejection of truth ‘by way of experiment’ speaks against the seriousness of his tenets, whilst Karl Marx's refusal to countenance questions about ultimate origins led to “the fantasy of self-creation”. Faith follows from the "rational necessity of adhering to those norms of rational inquiry and judgment needed ... to overcome ignorance, illusion and error"; science seeks causes and treats chance as residuum of coincidence. An argument for necessity or causeless-ness of the Universe is not reasonable, since neither is discoverable in any of the Universe's component entities or states of affairs. Finnis rejects Richard Dawkins’ appeal to ever increasing complexity in The God Delusion and quotes Charles Darwin's "conviction of the existence of God", which “follows from the extreme difficulty or rather impossibility of conceiving this immense and wonderful universe, including man with this capacity of looking far backwards and far into futurity ... I deserve to be called a Theist”. Divine revelation enhances and corrects the understanding of natural reason, so that there is epistemic interdependence, a reflective equilibrium, between the two. In ideal epistemic conditions (absent self-interest and passions), there would be broad consensus on matters of right and wrong, which supports the appeal to a higher ordering principle (God). The belief in God has implications for how we act in the World. John Dewey's conflation of knowledge with practical control undermines “human rights which had to be insisted on in the aftermath of Nazism and the like”. Since religious argument appeals to reasons, it is a valid exercise in public reason, and neither atheism nor agnosticism must be treated as the default position in public reason, deliberation, and decisions. Religion deserves constitutional protection and should be critically analysed by the courts for its soundness with general principles of natural reason. Rawls’ thesis could not stand against certain versions of Islam that would remove religious freedom (NB in n. 21 Finnis argues that Aquinas’ support for coercion against heretics was inherently unsound). Contra Augustine, Finnis argues that eternal life is not a beatific vision detached from our human experience but is the perfection of our morally significant choices.

=== Philosophy of law ===
Finnis's concept of law is elaborated in Natural Law and Natural Rights. This section summarises some of his contributions in Parts one and two of his Philosophy of Law. In Part Three of his Philosophy of Law Finnis offers a critical account of legal reasoning (incl. notions of rights and analogical reasoning), and in Part Four he addresses the legal challenges posed by revolutions and the possibility of voting for unjust laws.

Positive laws do not acquire their authority from conceptual coherence (in fact, contradictory laws can coexist) or derivation from an established process. Instead, their authority derives from morality; Law "occupies the same place in the world as morality: […] what I should do and what type of person I should be". This is the central (or most meaningful) feature of the Law, against which the improvement of any legal system is predicated. Individuals will only obey specific laws that work against their interests or are unjust, if they consider the overall system of Law to be fair (the Golden rule) because it supports shared interests grounded on the promotion of basic goods. Unjust laws are not laws in the proper sense, "though they may still count in reasonable conscious deliberations, and certainly warrant attention and description". Against Joseph Raz, Finnis argues that morality is not external to the Law since the Law makes moral pursuits (e.g., cooperation among people) possible – "the Law presents itself as a seamless web" of people and transactions. A specific law or legal determination is an application of a general moral principle that can take many different forms. Thus, the process of practical reasoning leading to the elaboration of laws is not like "the omelette that can be made by following a recipe" (a concept further developed in Finnis' critique of Dworkin's Law's Empire). Finnis rejects the following as valid accounts of legal practical reasoning: the Economic Analysis of the Law, Game Theory, the Co-ordination problem, Kant's rationality, and John Rawls' original position. Against H. L. A. Hart, Finnis rejects "survival" as a central feature of the Law: "human rationality can also reflect that the arbitrariness involved in unrestricted self-preference is itself a deviation from 'rationality'...". He further rejects Hart’s theory of action, so that normativity follows from reasons not decisions. In his Grand Tour of Legal History, Finnis shows that the Natural Law tradition offers a superior account than Legal Positivism of every aspect of Law, including the meaning of rights, authority, legal methodology, institutionality, tort law, contract law, criminal law, international law, and so on. Finnis argues that the definition of Law "cannot be resolved by any purely ‘analytical’ technique aspiring to be neutral", it must "engage to some extent in reflexion on the moral order…" with implications for anyone involved in the making and application of laws. Hart's internal point of view only makes sense as a method in social science if it presupposes the understanding of the basic goods. Patrick Devlin's "positive morality" cannot serve as a foundation for the Law because it is simply a set of opinions held by a group of people, lacking critical reflexivity.William Blackstone’s notion of natural law served no purpose in his conception of law because it is impoverished, as it took "the naked individual in his state of nature as the standard". Max Weber dismissed natural law because he refused to accept the objectivity of values, that is, their accessibility to the intellect (as did Hart). Finnis provides an account of positive law according to Aristotle and Aquinas, and engages in a sharp critique of postmodernism and critical legal studies as failing on their own terms.

=== Fundamentals of Ethics ===
This book sets out the ontological and epistemological foundations of Finnis' work. This includes rejection of the notion that human goods result from human desires, in favour of the view that they are actualizations of, and participation in, basic goods. Thus, "epistemology is not the 'basics of ethics'" (p. 21), rather ethics is concerned with reasoning about basic goods as experienced by the individual. Robert Nozick's metaphor of the 'experience machine' shows that desires cannot guide ethics, since no one would choose a lifetime of pleasure over one of achievement. People are attracted to the basic goods in the search for "perfection", rather than Humean satisfaction. Thin theories of the good that pretend to satisfy the needs of everyone, such as that offered by John Rawls, result in a thin account of practical reason. Finnis rejects arguments from queerness and naturalism that would deny objectivity to statements of value. Such objectiviy can be compared to that of colour: "postboxes in England are seen as red because they are red ... "Red postbox" is not short for "red to human beings postbox" (p. 65). Redness is an 'anthropomorphic category'" (i.e. distinct from the object itself but still objectively true and valid). Finnis proposes the "transparency of reason", so that "I think that p (since...)" is transparent for "It is the case that p" or simply "p"; and associates this line of reasoning to the nature of questions of (rather than about) conscience. Practical reasonableness operating along eight or nine basic requirements offers an intermediate principle that bridges the gap between basic goods and values. Finnis defends the possibility of freedom, the positing of which already involves an exercise in freedom (whether to believe in it or not). Any choice among basic goods must involve the exercise of freedom, since they are incommensurable. Such choices create vital commitments (through the expectation of consistency in future choices and actions) until such time as an incompatible choice is made (involving repentance from the previous choice). Choosing is apprehended by the intellect not only as A or B but much like knowledge or understanding, as involving a choice of character. The book also contains an extensive methodological critique of Kantian and utilitarian ethics.

== Critics ==
In his book on Finnis' student Neil Gorsuch while at Oxford University, John Greenya has described Finnis's views by stating: "Some of John Finnis's views are very controversial. For example, in defending his long-held position against same-sex marriage and same-sex coupling, he once compared them to bestiality."

Philosopher Stephen Buckle sees Finnis's list of proposed basic goods as plausible, but notes that "Finnis's account becomes more controversial when he goes on to specify the basic requirements of practical reasonableness". He sees Finnis's requirement that practical reason requires "respect for every basic value in every act" as intended both to rule out consequentialism in ethics and also to support the moral viewpoint of the Catholic Church on a range of contentious issues, including contraception and masturbation, which in his view undermines its plausibility.

Finnis's work on natural law ethics has been a source of controversy in both neo-Thomist and analytical circles. Craig Paterson sees his work as interesting because it challenges a key assumption of both neo-Thomist and analytical philosophy: the idea that a natural law ethics must be based upon an attempt to derive normative (or "ought") statements from descriptive (or "is") statements.

According to Andrew Sullivan, Finnis has articulated "an intelligible and subtle account of homosexuality" based on the new natural law, a less biologically based version of natural law theory. Finnis argues that the state should deter public approval of homosexual behaviour while refusing to persecute individuals on the basis of their sexual orientation, basing this position not on the claim that homosexual sex is unnatural but on the idea that it cannot involve the union of procreation and emotional commitment that heterosexual sex can, and is therefore an assault on heterosexual union. The following excerpts, for example, come from his 1994 essay "Law, Morality, and 'Sexual Orientation'":

In short, sexual acts are not unitive in their significance unless they are marital (actualizing the all-level unity of marriage) and (since the common good of marriage has two aspects) they are not marital unless they have not only the generosity of acts of friendship but also the procreative significance.

...The plain fact is that those who propound "gay" ideology have no principled moral case to offer against (prudent and moderate) promiscuity, indeed the getting of orgasmic sexual pleasure in whatever friendly touch or welcoming orifice (human or otherwise) one may opportunely find it.

Finnis earlier argues in the article that same-sex activity "cannot express or do more than is expressed or done if two strangers engage in such activity to give each other pleasure, or a prostitute pleasures a client to give him pleasure in return for money". Sullivan believes that such a conservative position is vulnerable to criticism on its own terms, since the stability of existing families is better served by the acceptance of those homosexuals who are part of them. Other scholars, such as Stephen Macedo and Michael J. Perry, have also criticised Finnis's views.

== A selection of articles and video lectures ==
- Aquinas' Moral, Political and Legal Philosophy
- The Profound Injustice of Judge Posner on Marriage
- Natural Law: The Classical Tradition (Internet Archive)
- The Priority of Persons
- "Economy or Explication? Telling the Truth About God and Man in a Pluralist Society" (PDF). Archived from the original (PDF) on 22 July 2010.
- The Good of Marriage and the Morality of Sexual Relations.
- Law, Morality and "Sexual Orientation".

=== Video lectures ===
- God and Man
- Religious Liberty
