= Employment discrimination =

Form of discrimination

Employment discrimination is a form of illegal discrimination in the workplace based on legally protected characteristics. In the U.S., federal anti-discrimination law prohibits discrimination by employers against employees based on age, race, gender, sex (including pregnancy, sexual orientation, and gender identity), religion, national origin, and physical or mental disability. State and local laws often protect additional characteristics such as marital status, veteran status and caregiver/familial status. Earnings differentials or occupational differentiation—where differences in pay come from differences in qualifications or responsibilities—should not be confused with employment discrimination. Discrimination can be intended and involve disparate treatment of a group or be unintended, yet create disparate impact for a group.

== Definition ==
In neoclassical economics theory, labor market discrimination is defined as the different treatment of two equally qualified individuals on account of their gender, race, disability, religion, etc. In religion, the Catholic Church prohibits disabled persons from becoming priests which excludes them from a paid role. Discrimination is harmful since it affects the economic outcomes of equally productive workers directly and indirectly through feedback effects. Darity and Mason [1998] summarise that the standard approach used in identifying employment discrimination is to isolate group productivity differences (education, work experience). Differences in outcomes (such as earnings, job placement) that cannot be attributed to worker qualifications are attributed to discriminatory treatment.

In the non-neoclassical view, discrimination is the main source of inequality in the labor market and is seen in the persistent gender and racial earnings disparity in the U.S. Non-neoclassical economists define discrimination more broadly than neoclassical economists. For example, the feminist economist Deborah Figart (1997) defines labor market discrimination as "a multi-dimensional interaction of economic, social, political, and cultural forces in both the workplace and the family, resulting in different outcomes involving pay, employment, and status." That is, discrimination is not only about measurable outcomes but also about unquantifiable consequences. The process is as important as the outcomes. Furthermore, gender norms are embedded in labor markets and shape employer preferences as well worker preferences; therefore, it is not easy to separate discrimination from productivity-related inequality.

Although labor market inequalities have declined after the U.S. Civil Rights Act of 1964, the movement towards equality has slowed down after the mid-1970s, especially more in gender terms than racial terms. The key issue in the debate on employment discrimination is the persistence of discrimination, namely, why discrimination persists in a capitalist economy.

== Evidence ==
=== Statistical ===
Gender earnings gap or the concentration of men and women workers in different occupations or industries in and of itself is not evidence of discrimination. Therefore, empirical studies seek to identify the extent to which earnings differentials are due to worker qualification differences. Many studies find that qualification differences do not explain more than a portion of the earnings differences. The portion of the earnings gap that cannot be explained by qualifications is then attributed by some to discrimination. One prominent formal procedure for identifying the explained and unexplained portions of the gender wage differentials or wage gap is the Oaxaca–Blinder decomposition procedure.

Another type of statistical evidence of discrimination is gathered by focusing on homogeneous groups. This approach has the advantage of studying economic outcomes of groups with very similar qualifications.

In a well-known longitudinal study, the University of Michigan Law School (U.S.A.) graduates were surveyed between 1987 and 1993, and later between 1994 and 2000 to measure the changes in the wage gap. The group was intentionally chosen to have very similar characteristics. Although the gap in earnings between men and women was very small immediately after graduation, it widened in 15 years to the point that women earned 60 percent of what men earned. From the abstract: Sex differences in hours worked have increased over time and explain more of the sex-based earnings gap, while sex differences in job settings and years spent in private practice have declined and explain less of the gap.

Other studies on relatively homogeneous group of college graduates produced a similar unexplained gap, even for the highly educated women, such as Harvard MBAs in the United States. One such study focused on gender wage differences in 1985 between the college graduates. The graduates were chosen from the ones who earned their degree one or two years earlier. The researchers took college major, GPA (grade point average) and the educational institution the graduates attended into consideration. Yet, even after these factors were accounted for, there remained a 10-15 percent pay gap based on gender. Another study based on a 1993 survey of all college graduates had similar results for black and white women regarding gender differences in earnings. Both black women and white women made less money compared to white, non-Hispanic men. However, the results of earnings were mixed for Hispanic and Asian women when their earnings were compared to white, non-Hispanic men. A 2006 study looked at Harvard graduates. The researchers also controlled for educational performance such as GPA, SAT scores and college major, as well as time out of work and current occupation. The results showed 30 percent of the wage gap was unexplained. Therefore, although not all of the unexplained gaps attribute to discrimination, the results of the studies signal gender discrimination, even if these women are highly educated. Human capitalists argue that measurement and data problems contribute to this unexplained gap.

One recent example of employment discrimination is the inequality in higher positions. For instance, while 62% of accountants and auditors in the US are women, only 9% of Chief Financial Officers (CFOs) in the US are women. According to the research, not only are women underrepresented in their profession, but they are also underpaid, 16% less on average.

According to the United Nations, approximately one in six people globally experience discrimination on various grounds, with racial discrimination, gender, and disability being among the most common.

=== From experiments ===
It is possible to investigate hiring discrimination experimentally by sending fabricated job applications to employers, where the fictitious candidates differ only by the characteristic to be tested (e.g. ethnicity, gender, age...). This method is also called correspondence testing. If the researchers receive less positive replies for minority applicants, it can be concluded that this minority faces discrimination in hiring. A systematic review of 40 studies conducted between 2000 and 2014 found significant discrimination against ethnic minorities at all stages of the recruitment process, concluding that overall "race/ethnic minority groups needed to apply for nearly twice as many jobs as the majority group to get a positive response". When investigating gender-based discrimination, the same review concluded that "men applying for strongly female-stereotyped jobs need to make between twice to three times as many applications as do women to receive a positive response for these jobs" and "women applying to male-dominated jobs face lower levels of discrimination in comparison to men applying to female-dominated jobs." This study also identified discrimination based on age (against older workers), sexual orientation and obesity.

A meta-analysis of more than 700 correspondence test conducted between 1990 and 2015 concluded that "[ethnic] minority applicants have 49% lower odds to be invited for an interview, compared to the equally qualified majority candidate". However, they found no indication of any systematic discrimination based on gender.

In a 2016 systematic review intending to list "(Almost) All Correspondence Experiments Since 2005", virtually all studies of racial discrimination found that ethnic minorities were disadvantaged. Of 11 studies that looked at gender discrimination, five found no evidence of discrimination, four found that women were advantaged, and two found that men were advantaged. Some studies also identified discrimination based on attractiveness, less physically attractive people being less likely to be hired.

A meta-analysis of 18 studies from various OECD countries found that gay and lesbian applicants face discrimination in hiring on the same level as ethnic discrimination.

In 2021, a large-scale study published in Nature tracked the behavior of recruiters on a Swiss online recruitment platform. Based on more than 3 million profile views, they found that "immigrant and minority ethnic groups face a substantially lower contact rate compared to native Swiss citizens". The most affected groups were people from Asia (18.5% penalty) and Sub-Saharan Africa (17.1% penalty). On average, the study found "no evidence of meaningful differences between the contact rates of women and men". However, by looking separately at male-dominated and female-dominated occupations, the researchers found that women face a 6.7% hiring penalty in the 5 most male-dominated occupations (electrical workers, drivers, metal and machinery workers, construction and forestry/fishery/hunting). On the other hand, men face a 12.6% penalty when applying for jobs dominated by women (personal care, clerical support, health associates, clerks and health professionals).

In 2013, a US based study showed Muslim hijab wearing women had a gap in call backs that women not wearing hijabs with the same employment profiles did not have. The study ran a field experiment of 49 male and 63 female employees from 72 retails stores and 40 restaurants with price points that targeted mid-income level clientele. 14 women ages 19–22 and of varied ethnicities, volunteered to act as job applicants, "confederates". 14 additional women acted as "interaction observers." Each observer was paired with one confederate to oversee all eight of the confederate's trails. For half the trails the confederate wore a plain black hijab and dressed similarly, for the other half they dressed similarly but did not wear hijab. Confederates were coached on a verbal script and entering and leaving work places. Mock trials were held to prepare for the role. After training was complete confederate/observer pair were dispatched to eight different work places within a mall. The observer entered the store and acted as clientele, and timed the confederates interactions. The confederate, meanwhile, asked for a manager and then presented three questions regarding employment. The questions are as follow: "Do you have a job position open for a______ (sales representative/waitress)?", "Could I fill out a job application?", and "What sort of things would I be doing if I worked here?" The confederate and observer were asked not to speak to one another until they had completed submitting data to avoid bias. The research comes to the conclusion that there is formal and interpersonal discrimination against hijab wearing Muslim women.

A selection of experiments that sent out fictional applications
Group feature	Group disadvantage	Comparison	Setting	Applications sent out	Ref.
African American	33.3% fewer interviews (Note: $33.3\%=1-(1/1.50)$)	Applicants with names that sound African American versus white	United States	2001 (July) to 2002 (May)	
Gay	5.0% and 5.1% fewer interview invitations (men and women) 1.9% and 1.2% lower salaries (men and women)	Applicants whose CVs indicate membership in gay university societies vs other student societies	United Kingdom	2013 (February–April)	
Middle Eastern ethnicity	33.3% fewer interviews	Applicants with male names that sound Middle Eastern versus Swedish (Note: "Swedish" names used: first names Erik, Karl and Lars and last names Andersson, Pettersson and Nilsson. "Middle Eastern" names used: first names Ali, Reza and Mohammed and last names Ameer, Hassan and Said. (p. 719))	Sweden	2005 (May) to 2006 (February)	
Hijab wearing Muslim Women	Major gap in call backs, permission to fill out job application and more perceived employer negativity and less employer interest.	Hijab wearing women versus non-Hijab wearing women	United States	Post 9/11	

=== From court cases ===
Darity and Mason [1998] summarize the court cases on discrimination, in which employers were found guilty and huge awards were rewarded for plaintiffs. They argue that such cases establish the existence of discrimination. The plaintiffs were women or non-whites (St. Petersburg Times, 1997; Inter Press Service, 1996; The Chicago Tribune, 1997; The New York Times, 1993; the Christian Science Monitor, 1983; Los Angeles Times, 1996). Some examples are the following: In 1997, the allegations for the Publix Super Markets were "gender biases in on the job training, promotion, tenure and layoff policies; wage discrimination; occupational segregation; hostile work environment" (St. Petersburg Times, 1997, pp. 77). In 1996, allegations for Texaco were "racially discriminatory hiring, promotion and salary policies" (Inter Press Service, 1996; The Chicago Tribune, 1997, pp. 77). The six black workers, who were the plaintiffs, gave the taped racist comments of the white corporate officials as evidence (Inter Press Service, 1996; The Chicago Tribune, 1997). In 1983, the General Motors Corporation was sued both for gender and racial discrimination (the Christian Science Monitor, 1983). In 1993, the Shoney International was accused of "racial bias in promotion, tenure, and layoff policies; wage discrimination; hostile work environment (The New York Times, 1993, pp. 77) ". The victims were granted $105 million (The New York Times, 1993). In 1996, the plaintiffs of the Pitney Bowes, Inc. case were granted $11.1 million (Los Angeles Times, 1996).

== Neoclassical explanations ==
Neoclassical labor economists explain the existence and persistence of discrimination based on tastes for discrimination and statistical discrimination theories. While overcrowding model moves away from neoclassical theory, the institutional models are non-neoclassical.

=== Tastes for discrimination ===
The Nobel Prize-winning economist Gary Becker claimed the markets punish the companies that discriminate because it is costly. His argument is as following:

The profitability of the company that discriminates is decreased, and the loss is "directly proportional to how much the employer's decision was based on prejudice, rather than on merit." Indeed, choosing a worker with lower performance (in comparison to salary) causes losses proportional to the difference in performance. Similarly, the customers who discriminate against certain kinds of workers in favor of less effective have to pay more for their services, in the average.

If a company discriminates, it typically loses profitability and market share to the companies that do not discriminate, unless the state limits free competition protecting the discriminators.

However, there is a counter-argument against Becker's claim. As Becker conceptualized, discrimination is the personal prejudice or a "taste" associated with a specific group, originally formulated to explain employment discrimination based on race. The theory is based on the idea that markets punish the discriminator in the long run as discrimination is costly in the long run for the discriminator. There are three types of discrimination, namely: employer, employee and customer.

In the first one, the employer has a taste for discriminating against women and is willing to pay the higher cost of hiring men instead of women. Thus, the non-pecuniary cost brings an additional cost of discrimination in dollar terms; the full cost of employing women is the wage paid plus this additional cost of discrimination. For the total cost of men and women to be equal, women are paid less than men. In the second type, the male employees have a distaste for working with women employees. Because of the non-pecuniary cost, they must be paid more than women. In the third type, the customers or clients have a distaste for being served by woman employees. Therefore, the customers are willing to pay higher prices for a good or a service in order not to be served by women. The as-if non-pecuniary cost is associated with purchasing goods or services from women.

Becker's theory states that discrimination cannot exist in the long run because it is costly. However, discrimination seems to persist in the long run; it declined only after the Civil Rights Act, as it was seen in the economic history. Regardless, it is argued that Becker's theory holds for occupational segregation. For instance, men are more likely to work as truck drivers, or the female customers are more likely to choose to be served by women lingerie salespersons because of preferences. However, this segregation cannot explain the wage differentials. In other words, occupational segregation is an outcome of group-typing of employment between different groups but consumer discrimination does not cause wage differentials. Thus, customer discrimination theory fails to explain the combination of employment segregation and the wage differentials. However, the data points out the jobs associated with women suffer from lower pay.

=== Statistical discrimination ===
Edmund Phelps [1972] introduced the assumption of uncertainty in hiring decisions. When employers make a hiring decision, although they can scrutinize the qualifications of the applicants, they cannot know for sure which applicant would perform better or would be more stable. Thus, they are more likely to hire the male applicants over the females, if they believe on average men are more productive and more stable. This general view affects the decision of the employer about the individual on the basis of information on the group averages.

Blau et al. [2010] point out the harmful consequences of discrimination via feedback effects regardless of the initial cause of discrimination. The non-neoclassical insight that is not part of the statistical discrimination sheds light onto uncertainty. If a woman is given less firm-specific training and is assigned to lower-paid jobs where the cost of her resigning is low based on the general view of women, then this woman is more likely to quit her job, fulfilling the expectations, thus to reinforce group averages held by employers. However, if the employer invests a lot on her, the chance that she will stay is higher.

== Non-neoclassical approach ==
=== Overcrowding model ===
This non-neoclassical model was first developed by Barbara Bergmann. According to the model, outcome of the occupational segregation is wage differentials between the two genders. The reasons for segregation may be socialization, individual decisions, or labor market discrimination. Wage differentials occur when the job opportunities or demand for the female-dominated sector is less than the supply of women. According to the evidence, in general female dominated jobs pay less than male dominated jobs. The pay is low because of the high number of women who choose female dominated jobs or they do not have other opportunities.

When there is no discrimination in the market and both female and male workers are equally productive, wages are the same regardless of type of the job, F or M jobs. Assume the equilibrium wages in job F is higher than that of the M jobs. Intuitively, the workers in the less paying job will transfer to the other sector. This movement ceases only when the wages in two sectors are equal. Therefore, when the market is free of discrimination, wages are the same for different types of jobs, provided that there is sufficient time for adjustment and attractiveness of each job is the same.

When there is discrimination in the M jobs against women workers, or when women prefer the F jobs, economic outcomes change. When there is a limit of available M jobs, its supply decreases; thus, wages of the M jobs increase. Because women cannot enter to the M jobs or they choose the F jobs, they "crowd" into F jobs. Consequently, higher supply of F jobs decreases its wage rates. Briefly, segregation causes the gender wage differentials regardless of the equal skills.

Another striking point of overcrowding model is productivity. Since women in the F jobs cost less it is rational to substitute labor for capital. On the contrary, it is rational to substitute capital for labor in the M jobs. Therefore, overcrowding causes wage differentials and it makes women less productive although they were potentially equally productive initially.

The question of why women prefer working in female-dominated sectors is an important one. Some advocate this choice stems from inherently different talents or preferences; some insist it is due to the differences in socialization and division of labor in the household; some believe it is because of discrimination in some occupations.

=== Institutional models ===
Institutional models of discrimination indicate labor markets are not as flexible as it is explained in the competitive models. Rigidities are seen in the institutional arrangements, or in the monopoly power. Race and gender differences overlap with labor market institutions. Women occupy certain jobs as versus men. However, institutional models do not explain discrimination but describe how labor markets work to disadvantage women and blacks. Most jobs relegated to women involve the role of a caregiver which could mean nursing or teaching that demands someone with a caring nature that are often subjected to women. Thus, institutional models do not subscribe to the neoclassical definition of discrimination. Along the same lines of gender differences, women are continuously penalized for taking leave to care for their newborn children which employers tend to find a problem with. New mothers feel the pressure from their workplace to come back as soon as possible after giving birth which puts them in a tight spot trying to be there for their children and also finding caregivers for them that leads to stressful situations. New fathers are also rarely given parental time off.

Additionally, studies have documented a significant "motherhood wage penalty," with mothers earning approximately 5% less per child compared to childless women, highlighting the financial impact of taking maternity leave.

==== The internal labor market ====
The firms hire workers outside or use internal workforce based on worker progress, which plays a role in climbing the promotion ladder. Big firms usually put the workers into groups in order to have similarity within the groups. When employers think certain groups have different characteristics related to their productivity, statistical discrimination may occur. Consequently, workers might be segregated based on gender and race.

==== Primary and secondary jobs ====
Peter Doeringer and Michael Piore [1971] established the dual labor market model. In this model, primary jobs are the ones with high firm-specific skills, high wages, good promotion opportunities and long-term attachment. On the contrary, secondary jobs are the ones with less skill requirement, lower wages, less promotion opportunities and higher labor turnover. The dual labor market model combined with the gender discrimination suggests that men dominate the primary jobs and that women are over-represented in the secondary jobs.

The difference between primary and secondary jobs also creates productivity differences, such as different level of on-the-job training. Moreover, women have lower incentives for stability since benefits of secondary jobs are less.

Moreover, lack of informal networking from male colleagues, visualizing women in the female dominated jobs and lack of encouragement do affect the economic outcomes for women. They are subject to unintentional institutional discrimination, which alters their productivity, promotion, and earnings negatively.

The under-representation of women in top-level management might be explained by the "pipeline" argument which states that women are newcomers and it takes time to move toward the upper levels. The other argument is about barriers that prevent women from advance positions. However, some of these barriers are non-discriminatory. Work and family conflicts is an example of why there are fewer females in the top corporate positions.

Yet, both the pipeline and work-family conflict together cannot explain the very low representation of women in the corporations. Discrimination and subtle barriers still count as a factor for preventing women from exploring opportunities. Moreover, it was found out that when the chairman or CEO of the corporation was a woman, the number of women working in the high level positions and their earnings increased around 10-20 percent. The effect of female under-representation on earnings is seen in the 1500 S&P firms studied. The findings indicate women executives earn 45 percent less than male executives based on the 2.5 percent of executives in the sample. Some of the gap is due to seniority, yet mostly it was because of the under-representation of women in CEO, chair or president positions and the fact that women managed smaller companies.

Non-neoclassical economists point out subtle barriers play a huge role in women's disadvantage. These barriers are difficult to document and to remove. For instance, women are left out of male's network. Moreover, the general perception is men are better at managing others, which is seen in the Catalyst's Fortune 1000 survey. The 40 percent of women executives said that they believed man had difficulty when they were managed by women. A separate study found out majority believed in "women, more than men, manifest leadership styles associated with effective performance as leaders,… more people prefer male than female bosses". In another study in the U.S. about origins of gender division of labor, people were asked these two questions "When jobs are scarce, men should have more right to a job than women?" and "On the whole, men make better political leaders than women do?" Some answers indicated discriminatory act.

=== Emerging models of discrimination ===
==== Privation of inclusion ====
Privation of inclusion is a type of racial discrimination seen in institutions, especially in predominantly white organizations. It's a covert form of discrimination where those in positions of power use organizational rules and policies to exclude people based on race, all while claiming to promote inclusivity. This concept differs from straightforward exclusion, as it involves a complex interplay of exclusion and inclusion, making it harder to discern. It is marked by limited access to opportunities for racially diverse individuals in the workplace, such as creation of disincentives and blocked career paths. This phenomenon is deeply ingrained in institutional practices, forming a normative culture that sustains racial inequalities. It's distinct from racial gatekeeping, which focuses on discrimination against racially different individuals before their admission to such organizations, while privation of inclusion occurs after admission.

== Critique of the neoclassical approach ==
Neoclassical economics ignores logical explanations of how self-fulfilling prophecy by the employers affect the motivation and psychology of women and minority groups and thus it alters the decision making of individuals regarding human capital. This is the feedback explanation that correlates with the drop in human capital investment (such as more schooling or training) attainment by women and minorities.

Moreover, power and social relationships link discrimination to sexism and racism, which is ignored in the neoclassical theory. Furthermore, along with the classical and Marxist theory of competition, racial-gender structure of the job is related to the bargaining power and thus wage differential. Therefore, discrimination persists since racial and gender characteristics shape who gets the higher paying jobs, both within and between occupations. In short, the power relationships are embedded in the labor market, which are neglected in the neoclassical approach.

In addition, critics have argued that the neoclassical measurement of discrimination is flawed. As Figart [1997] points out, conventional methods do not put gender or race into the heart of the analysis and they measure discrimination as the unexplained residual. As a result, we are not informed about the causes and nature of discrimination. She argues that gender and race should not be marginal to the analysis but at the center and suggests a more dynamic analysis for discrimination. Figart argues gender is more than a dummy variable since gender is fundamental to the economy. Moreover, the segmentation in the labor market, institutional variables and non-market factors affect wage differentials and women dominate low-paid occupations. Again, none of these is because of productivity differentials nor are they the outcome of voluntary choices. Figart also indicates how women's jobs are associated with unskilled work. For that reason, men do not like association of "their" jobs with women or femininity, skills are engendered.

Although empirical evidence is a tool to use to prove discrimination, it is important to pay attention to the biases involved in using this tool. The biases might cause under or over-estimation of labor market discrimination. There is lack of information on some individual qualifications which indeed affect their potential productivity. The factors such as motivation or work effort, which affects incomes, are difficult to be scaled. Moreover, information regarding the type of college degree may not be available. In short, all the job qualification related factors are not included to study gender wage gap.

An example for underestimation is the feedback effect of labor market discrimination. That is, women may choose to invest less in human capital such as pursuing a college degree based on the current wage gap, which is also a result of discrimination against women. Another reason may be the childbearing responsibilities of women standing as a negative impact on women's careers since some women may choose to withdraw from the labor market with their own will. By doing so, they give up opportunities, such as the firm-specific training that would have potentially helped with their job promotion or reduction in the wage gap. An example of over-estimation of gender discrimination is men might have been more motivated at work. Therefore, it is wrong to equate unexplained wage gap with discrimination, although most of the gap is a result of discrimination, but not all.

Furthermore, empirical evidence can also be twisted to show that discrimination does not exist or it is so trivial that it can be ignored. This was seen in the results and interpretation of the results of Armed Forces Qualifying Test, (AFQT). Neal and Johnson [1996] claimed the economic differences in the black and white labor markets were due to the "pre-market factors," not to discrimination. Darity and Mason's [1998] study of the same case disagrees with the findings of Neal and Johnson's [1996]. They take into account factors such as age family background, school quality and psychology into consideration to make the adjustments.

== Theoretical bases of discrimination relating to employment ==
There are legal and structural theories forming the basis of employment discrimination.

=== Legal theories: explained through the case of USA ===
The pinnacle of anti-employment discrimination law in the USA is Title VII of the Civil Rights Act of 1964 which prohibits employment discrimination on the basis of race, color, religion, sex, and national origin. In this section, two theories are laid out: disparate treatment and disparate impact.

Disparate treatment is what most people commonly think of discrimination- intentional. Under this theory, the employee must belong to a protected class, apply and be qualified for a job where the employer was seeking applicants, and get rejected from the job. The job position must then still be open post-rejection for a discrimination case to be made.

In many cases the courts found it difficult to prove intentional discrimination, thus the disparate impact legal theory was added. It covers the more complicated side of discrimination where "some work criterion was fair in form but discriminatory in practice". Employees must prove that the employment practices used by an employer causes disparate impact on the basis of race, color, religion, sex, and/or national origin. To help with cases, the Equal Employment Opportunity Commission established a four-fifths rule where federal enforcement agencies takes a "selection rate for any race, sex, or ethnic group which is less than four-fifths" as evidence for disparate impact.

=== Structural theories ===
In a concept called "token dynamics", there are three noticeable occurrences in discrimination: "visibility that leads to performance pressures, contrast effects that lead to social isolation of the token, and role encapsulation or stereotyping of the token". In the first occurrence, the token is noticeable because of his or her race, age, sex, or physical disability which is different from the majority of workers. This visibility directs more attention to the token and he or she is subjected to more pressure from superiors when compared to other employees. Not only is this token scrutinized more, but there is an unspoken expectation that his or her performance is a representation of all members of his or her group. A common example is a solo female engineer. Her work is examined under a more judgmental gaze than her male coworkers because of her minority status. If she were to underperform, her failures speak on behalf of all female engineers; thus their ability to be seen as successful engineers is threatened. In the second occurrence of contrast, differences between tokens and the majority are emphasized which isolates the token group and increases unity among the majority. Going along with the previous example, male engineers "may start to identify themselves as men, instead of simply as engineers, once a token woman engineer shows up. Moreover, they may notice characteristics they may have in common that the token lacks, such as experience in the military or team sports". The third occurrence, stereotyping, is its own theory discussed below.

Behavioral scientists classify stereotyping into prescriptive and descriptive. "Prescriptive stereotypes specify how men and women, should behave, whereas descriptive stereotypes specify how men and women, do behave". In the field of employment, descriptive stereotyping is more applicable and occurs more often. One common example is when superiors assume a woman will be upset if criticized, so they might not provide the accurate feedback the woman needs to improve. This then hinders her chances of promotion, especially when superiors have given men, who they believe will "take it like a man", the information they need to improve their performance. This kind of stereotyping can also affect what jobs employers give to their male and female applicants. Men and women are frequently "matched" with jobs that are themselves stereotyped according to the different characteristics and duties associated with the job. The most significant example is the top position of CEO or manager which has been associated with male traits for over twenty years.

== Consequences of discrimination ==
Employment discrimination can have individual, group, and organizational consequences.

=== Individual ===
Perceived discrimination in the workplace has been linked to negative physical symptoms. In a study from 1977 to 1982, women who perceived they were experiencing discrimination were 50% more likely to have a physical limitation in 1989 compared to those who did not perceive discriminatory experiences.

There have been two common ways of reacting to discrimination: emotion-focused coping and problem-focused coping. In the former, individuals protect their self-esteem by attributing any discrepancies in hiring or promotion to discrimination instead of reflecting on their own potential shortcomings. In the latter, individuals attempt to change aspects of themselves that caused them to be discriminated against to prevent themselves from future discrimination. Some common examples are obese people losing weight or mentally ill people seeking therapy. This approach can only be sought out when the point of discrimination is not unchangeable like race or age.

=== Group ===
Unlike the individual level, discrimination at the group level can induce feelings of fear and mistrust within the group discriminated which often results in inhibited performance. The effects are most commonly seen with age, disability, and race and ethnicity.

Age discrimination is prevalent because companies have to consider how long older works will stay and the costs of their health insurance accordingly. When companies let these insecurities affect their treatment of older workers- hostile work environment, demotions, lower employment rates-, these older workers who perceive this discrimination are 59% more likely to leave their current job.

Though there are currently anti-discrimination laws on disability, namely the Americans with Disabilities Act, discrimination against weight is still prevalent. What makes the issue complicated is the fact that obesity only counts as a disability when someone is "morbidly obese" (100% over their ideal body weight) or obese (20% over their ideal body weight) as a result of psychological conditions. Considering that only 0.5% of people in the United States are morbidly obese, 99.5% of obese individuals have the burden to prove their excess weight comes from psychological causes if they are to be protected from anti-discrimination law.

Another body of people that face widespread group discrimination are racial minorities, mainly Blacks and Hispanics. They are rated as less favorable than White applicants and this kind of prejudice makes them "suffer from increased role ambiguity, role conflict, and work tension, as well as decreased organizational commitment and job satisfaction". Further analysis and statistics of the discrimination they face are discussed below by region.

=== Organizational ===
Companies hurt from their own discriminatory practices on a legal, economic, and reputational risk basis. In 2005 alone, 146,000 charges of discrimination were filed. Discrimination litigation can be very expensive when taking into account the time spent in court and the outcome of the ruling where the possibility of settlement money comes in to play as well as "hiring, promotion, backpay, or reinstatement" for the prosecutor. Research has found that public cases of discrimination, regardless of being taken to court, has a negative effect on a company's reputation which typically decreases sales. Research published in the Global Strategy Journal demonstrated that corporate social irresponsibility (CSI) incidents—such as discrimination—substantially damage brand reputation and hinder international sales growth. The study tracked the performance of 335 company branches across 109 countries over nine years, revealing that unethical behavior adversely affects consumer perceptions and sales.

Another viewpoint on discrimination affecting profit is that companies may not be using their employees they discriminate to the best of their ability. Some see these employees as an "untapped niche" (a small, specialist field or group that has not been used to its full potential) especially since diversity management is positively correlated with corporate financial performance.

== Government's efforts to combat discrimination ==
=== Why the government should intervene to address discrimination ===
Blau et al. [2010] sum up the argument for government intervention to address discrimination. First, discrimination prevents equity or fairness, when an equally qualified person does not receive equal treatment as another on account of race or gender. Second, discrimination results in inefficient allocation of resources because workers are not hired, promoted or rewarded based on their skills or productivity.

Becker claimed discrimination in the labor market is costly to employers. His theory is based on the assumption that in order to survive in the existence of competitive markets, employers cannot discriminate in the long run. Strongly believing in the perfect functioning of markets without government or trade union intervention, it was claimed that employer discrimination declines in the long run without political intervention. On the contrary, intervention of human capital investment and regulation of racial interactions make it worse for the disadvantaged groups. Moreover, it was claimed discrimination could only persist due to the "taste" for discrimination and lower education level of blacks explained the labor-market discrimination.

However, based on the empirical study, either human capital theory or Becker's tastes theory does not fully explain racial occupational segregation. That is seen with the increase in black work force in the South as an effect of Civil Rights laws in the 1960s. Therefore, human-capital and "taste-for-discrimination" are not sufficient explanations and government intervention is effective. Becker's claim about employers would not discriminate as it is costly in the competitive markets is weakened by the evidence from real life facts. Sundstrom [1994] points out, it was also costly to violate the social norms since customers could stop buying the employer's goods or services; or the workers could quit working or drop their work effort. Moreover, even if the workers or the customers did not participate in such behaviors, the employer would not take the risk of experimenting by going against the social norms. This was seen from the historical data that compares the economic outcomes for the white and black races.

=== Looking at the position of women in World War II U.S. history ===
Women worked in the U.S. industrial sector during the World War II. However, after the war most women quit jobs and returned home for domestic production or traditional jobs. The departure of women from industrial jobs is argued to represent a case of discrimination.

The supply theory claims voluntary movement because women worked due to extraordinary situation and they chose to quit. Their involvement was based on patriotic feelings and their exit depended on personal preferences and it was a response to feminist ideology. On the contrary, demand theory claims working-class women changed occupations due to high industrial wages. Tobias and Anderson [1974] present the counter argument for supply theory. Furthermore, there were both housewives and working-class women, who had been working prior to the war in different occupations. According to Women's Bureau's interviews, majority of women who had been working wanted to continue to work after the war. Despite their will, they were laid off more than men. Most of them possibly had to choose lower-paying jobs.

The exit pattern shows their quit was not voluntarily. There were pressures women faced, such as change in position to janitorial job, more or new responsibilities at work, and additional or changed shifts that would not fit their schedules, which were all known by the management. Women lay-off rates were higher than men. Briefly, women were treated unequally postwar period at the job market although productivity of women was equal to that of men and women's wage cost was lower.

Supply and demand theories do not provide sufficient explanation regarding women's absence in industrial firms after the war. It is wrong to associate patriotism with the war-time women workers since some housewives quit their jobs at early periods of the war when the country needed their help the most. Some of the housewives were forced to quit as the second highest lay-off rate belonged to them. If their only concern was the well-being of their country at the war time, less persistence to exit would have been observed.

The demand theory partially holds as there were women who worked pre-war time for occupational and wage mobility opportunities. However, these experienced women workers voluntarily quit working more than housewives did. The reason is work-experienced women had many opportunities. However, women with fewer options of where to work, such as African-Americans, older married women, housewives and the ones working in lowest paying jobs, wanted to keep their jobs as long as possible. Thus, their leave was involuntarily.

Although women's job performance at least as good as men's, instead of trying to equalize pays, women's wages were kept below than men's. Women had higher lay-off rates but also they were not rehired despite the boom in the auto industry. Some argue this was due to the lack of a civil rights movement protecting the rights of women as it did for black men. This explanation is unsatisfactory since it does not explain anti-women worker behavior of the management or lack of protection from unions. Kossoudji et al. [1992] believe it was due to the need for two separate wage and benefits packages for men and women. Women had child care responsibilities such as day care arrangements and maternity leave.

=== U.S. anti-discrimination laws ===
Before the passage of the Civil Rights Act of 1964 in the U.S., employment discrimination was legal and widely practiced. The newspaper ads for various jobs indicated racial and gender discrimination explicitly and implicitly. These behaviors were all built on the assumption that women and blacks were inferior. At the turn of the 21st century, discrimination is still practiced but to a lesser degree and less overtly. The progress on the evident discrimination problem is visible. However, the effect of past is persistent on the economic outcomes, such as historical wage settings that influence current wages. Women are not only under-represented in the high-rank and high-paid jobs, but they are also over-represented in the secondary and lower-paid jobs. The interviews, personal law, wage data and confidential employment records with salaries along with other evidence show gender segregation and its effects on the labor market.

Although there is some inevitable occupational segregation based people's preferences, discrimination does exist. Moreover, persistence of discrimination remains even after government intervention. There is a decline in the wage gap due to three reasons: male wages decreased and women's wages increased; secondly, the human capital gap between the two genders and experience gap have been closing; thirdly, legal pressures decreased discrimination but there is still inequality in the national economy of the U.S.

The correlation of Civil Rights Act and decrease in discrimination suggests the Act served its purpose. Therefore, it is correct to say leaving discrimination to diminish to the competitive markets is wrong, as Becker had claimed. In 1961, Kennedy issued an executive order calling for a presidential commission on the status of women. In 1963, Equal Pay Act, which required the employers to pay the wages to men and women for the same work qualifications, was passed. In 1964, Title VII of the Civil Rights Act with the exception bona fide occupational qualifications (BFOQ) was accepted while the Equal Employment Opportunity Commission (EEOC) responsible to check whether the Equal Pay Act and Title VII of the Civil Rights Act of 1964 were followed. The Title VII of the Civil Rights Act was first written to forbid employment discrimination. Initially it prohibited discrimination on the basis of race, religion and national origin. However, inclusion of the sex accepted last minute. The Title VII addresses both the disparate impact and disparate treatment. In 1965, Executive Order 11246 was passed and in 1967, it was changed to include sex, which prohibited employment discrimination by all employers with federal contracts and subcontracts. In addition, it makes sure affirmative action takes place. In 1986, sexual harassment was accepted as illegal with Supreme Court's decision. In 1998, the largest sexual harassment settlement was negotiated with $34 million to be paid to female workers of Mitsubishi.

As a result of these government policies occupational segregation decreased. The gender wage gap started to get smaller after the 1980s, most likely due to indirect feedback effects which took time, but an immediate increase in the earnings of blacks was observed in 1964. However, the laws still do not control discrimination fully in terms of hiring, promotion and training programs etc.

==== Affirmative action ====
Executive Order 11246, which is enforced by the Office of Federal Contract Compliance, is an attempt to eliminate the gap between the advantaged and disadvantaged groups on account of gender and race. It requires contractors to observe their employment patterns. If there is under-representation of women and minorities, "goals and timetables" are created to employ more of the disadvantaged groups on account of gender and race. The pros and cons of affirmative action have been discussed. Some believe discrimination does not exist at all, or even if it does, prohibiting it is enough; affirmative action is not needed. Some agree that some affirmative action is needed but they have considerations regarding the use of goals and timetables as they might be too strict. Some think strong affirmative action is needed but they are worried if there would be really sincere effort to hire the qualified individuals from the vulnerable groups.

==== Minimum wage ====
Rodgers et al. [2003] state minimum wage can be used as a tool to combat discrimination, as well and to promote equality. Since discrimination is embedded in the labor market and affects its functioning, and discrimination creates a basis for labor market segregation and for occupational segregation, labor markets institutions and policies can be used to reduce the inequalities. Minimum wage is one of these policies that could be used.

The minimum wage has benefits because it alters the external market wage for women, provides a mechanism for regular increases in the wages and arranges social security. It affects women in the informal sector, which is highly dominated by women partly as an outcome of discrimination, by being a reference point. However, disadvantages include: first, the wage might be very low when skills and sector are not taken into consideration, secondly, adjustment may take time, thirdly, enforcement may not be feasible and finally when there are public spending cuts, the real value of the wage may decline due to social security.

According to libertarian economist Thomas Sowell, minimum wage simply shifts wage discrimination to employment discrimination. The logic is that if market wages are lower for minorities, then employers have an economic incentive to prefer hiring equally qualified minority candidates, whereas if all workers must be paid the same amount then employers will instead discriminate by not hiring minorities. Sowell blames minimum wage laws for the very high unemployment rate of black teenagers compared to white teenagers.

=== Workforce development ===
One approach that mitigates discrimination by emphasizing skills is workforce development programs. Federally funded job training caters to the unemployed and minority groups by focusing on providing opportunities for them including those who have been discriminated against. The Department of Labor has several employment training programs and resources targeted to support dislocated workers, Native Americans, people with disabilities, seniors, veterans, at risk youth, and other minorities.

== Employer efforts to balance representation ==
Employers should evaluate their workplace environment, structure, and activities to ensure that discrimination is minimized. Through organizing heterogenous work groups, interdependence, recognizing the influence of salience, creating formalized evaluation systems, and taking accountability of actions, companies can improve current discriminatory practices that may be occurring.

=== Heterogeneity in work groups ===
To promote unity throughout the workplace environment and discourage exclusion and isolation of certain minorities, work groups should rarely ever be created based on ascriptive characteristics. This way, employees are well integrated regardless of their race, sex, ethnicity, or age.

=== Interdependence ===
Working together in these heterogenous groups will reduce bias among those who are stereotyping by "encouraging them to notice counter-stereotypic information and form more individuated and accurate impressions". Collaboration among coworkers with different ascriptive characteristics works to break stereotyping and let members evaluate their coworkers on a more personal level and make more accurate judgments based on experience, not stereotypes.

=== Salience ===
Though most do not realize it, people are highly susceptible to stereotyping after focusing on a stereotyped category. For example, "men who were primed with stereotypic statements about women were more likely to ask a female job applicant 'sexist' questions and exhibit sexualized behavior (and it took them longer than nonprimed men to recognize non sexist words). Thus, a comment about pregnancy, a sex discrimination lawsuit, or diversity immediately before a committee evaluates a female job candidate is likely to exacerbate sex stereotyping in the evaluation." Employers can learn from this by making an effort to not bring up a minority-related comment before evaluating an employee in that group.

=== Formalized evaluation systems ===
The more informal and unstructured employee observations and evaluations are, the more susceptible supervisors become to bias. By implementing a formalized evaluation system that incorporates objective, reliable, specific, and timely performance data, organizations can better promote fairness and reduce the risk of workplace discrimination.

=== Accountability ===
As with any problem, being accountable for one's actions greatly reduces the behavior associated with that problem. "Accountability not only reduces the expression of biases, it also reduces bias in non-conscious cognitive processes, such as the encoding of information".

=== Examples ===
Some employers have made efforts to reduce the impact of unconscious or unintentional systematic bias. After a study found a substantial increase in hiring equity, some musical organizations have adopted the blind audition; in other fields like software engineering, communications, and design, this has taken the form of an anonymized response to a job application or interview challenge.

The language of job listings has been scrutinized; some phrases or wording are believed to resonate with particular demographics, or stereotypes about particular demographics, and lead to some women and minorities not applying because they can less easily visualized themselves in the position. Examples cited include "rockstar" (which may imply a male) and nurturing vs. dominant language. For example: "Superior ability to satisfy customers and manage company's association with them" vs. "Sensitive to clients' needs, can develop warm client relationships".

Employers concerned about gender and ethnic representation have adopted practices such as measuring demographics over time, setting diversity goals, intentionally recruiting in places beyond those familiar to existing staff, targeting additional recruiting to forums and social circles which are rich in female and minority candidates. Pinterest has made its statistics and goals public, while increasing efforts at mentorship, identifying minority candidates early, recruiting more minority interns, and adopting a "Rooney Rule" where at least one minority or female candidate must be interviewed for each leadership position, even if they are not in the end hired.

Statistics have found that women typically earn lower salaries than men for the same work, and some of this is due to differences in negotiations—either women do not ask for more money or their requests are not granted at the same rate as men. The resulting differences can be compounded if future employers use previous salary as a benchmark for the next negotiation. To solve both of these problems, some companies have simply banned salary negotiations and use some other method (such as industry average) to peg the salary for a particular role. Others have made salary information for all employees public within the company, which allows any disparities between employees in the same roles to be detected and corrected. Some research has suggested greater representation of women in the economic modeling of the labor force.

== Equity-deserving group's recommendations to combat discrimination ==
=== Muslims ===
==== Muslim women ====
Salima Ebrahim, a Canadian Muslim woman on behalf of the Canadian Council of Muslim Women, sent the following five recommendations through open letter to the UN Human Right's Council's Sub-Commission on the Promotion and Protection of Human Rights Working Group on Minorities. The first, that the Canadian government should fund governmental and non-governmental interfaith projects. The second, that there needs to education set up for media on Muslim stereotype awareness and Muslim community liaisons. The third, transparency in government policies including stakeholder consultations with the appropriate Muslim community. The fourth, when collecting data government should disaggregate it based on gender and religion. The fifth, ensure recommendations made by Special Rapporteur on Contemporary Forms of Racism, Racial Discrimination, Xenophobia and Related Intolerance, in 2004, be followed through.

== In teaching ==
Employment discrimination exists in the U.S. education system. The United States has nearly four million elementary, middle, and high school teachers. Among them, 83 percent are white, and only 8 percent are African American. A study shows that even as a qualified African American teacher applies to teach, not only is their chance of receiving an offer significantly lower than a white applicant, but they are also likely to be disproportionally placed in schools with large populations of children of color or children in poverty. There is a lack of racial diversity in the faculty of schools, especially in schools where there is a bigger population of African-American students who are unable to see teachers of the same race in their learning environment. According to evidence from this study, academically African-American students benefit when they see teachers of the same race in their classrooms.

Along with the K-12 school system, discrimination is also present in early childcare hiring as well. A study performed in 2019 revealed that when applying to become a childcare teacher, there is a significant difference in the amount of African American and Hispanic teachers who do not get called back for an interview compared to their white counterparts. This persists through all levels of experience in the field. The same study also shows that if a childcare center has predominantly white students, then it is less likely for a teacher of color to be hired at that institution.

== Protected categories ==
Laws often prohibit discrimination on the basis of:

- Race, color or ethnicity
- Sex or gender
- Pregnancy
- Religion or creed
- Language abilities
- Citizenship or nationality
- Disability or medical condition
- Association with a disabled person (such as a disabled child)
- Age
- Sexual orientation
- Gender identity
- Marital status

Exemptions in anti-discrimination laws often are based on citizenship and religious exemptions.

== Legal protection ==
Employees who complain may be protected against workplace or employment retaliation.

Many countries have laws prohibiting employment discrimination including:

- Employment discrimination law in Canada
- Employment discrimination law in the United States
- Employment discrimination law in the United Kingdom
- Employment discrimination law in the European Union

Sometimes these are part of broader anti-discrimination laws which cover housing or other issues.

== By region ==
During the past decade, hiring discrimination was measured by means of the golden standard to measure unequal treatment in the labour market, i.e. correspondence experiments. Within these experiments, fictitious job applications that only differ in one characteristic, are sent to real vacancies. By monitoring the subsequent call-back from employers, unequal treatment based on this characteristic can be measured and can be given a causal interpretation.

=== Europe ===
==== Ethnicity ====
Pervasive levels of ethnic labour market discrimination are found in Belgium, Greece, Ireland, Sweden and the UK. Job candidates with foreign names are found to get 24% to 52% less job interview invitations compared to equal candidates with native names. Ethnic discrimination is lower among the high-educated and in larger firms. In addition, unequal treatment is found to be heterogeneous by the labour market tightness in the occupation: compared to natives, candidates with a foreign-sounding name are equally often invited to a job interview if they apply for occupations for which vacancies are difficult to fill, but they have to send twice as many applications for occupations for which labor market tightness is low. Recent research shows that ethnic discrimination is nowadays driven by employers' concern that co-workers and customers prefer collaborating with natives. In addition, volunteering has found to be a way out of ethnic discrimination in the labour market.

==== Disability ====
In 2014, a large correspondence experiment was conducted in Belgium. Two applications of graduates, identical except that one revealed a disability (blindness, deafness or autism), were both sent out to 768 vacancies for which the disabled candidates could be expected to be as productive as their non-disabled counterparts, based on the vacancy information. In addition, the researcher randomly disclosed the entitlement to a substantial wage subsidy in the applications of the disabled candidates. Disabled candidates had a 48% lower chance to receive a positive reaction from the employer side compared with the non-disabled candidates. Potentially due to the fear of the red tape, disclosing a wage subsidy did not affect the employment opportunities of disabled candidates.

==== Gender and sexual orientation ====
While overall no severe levels of discrimination based on female gender is found, unequal treatment is still measured in particular situations, for instance when candidates apply for positions at a higher functional level in Belgium, when they apply at their fertiles ages in France, and when they apply for male-dominated occupations in Austria.

Discrimination based on sexual orientation varies by country. Revealing a lesbian sexual orientation (by means of mentioning an engagement in a rainbow organisation or by mentioning one's partner name) lowers employment opportunities in Cyprus and Greece but has, overall, no negative effect in Sweden and Belgium. In the latter country, even a positive effect of revealing a lesbian sexual orientation is found for women at their fertile ages.

==== Age ====
Pervasive levels of age discrimination are found in Belgium, England, France, Spain and Sweden. Job candidates revealing older age are found to get 39% (in Belgium) to 72% (in France) less job interview invitations compared to equal candidates revealing a younger name. Discrimination is heterogeneous by the activity older candidates undertook during their additional post-educational years. In Belgium, they are only discriminated if they have more years of inactivity or irrelevant employment.

==== Religion ====
A 2019 cross-national field experiment looking at 5 European nations, found that in the UK, Norway and the Netherlands, there was Anti-Muslim and origin based discrimination against job applicants in the private sector. They use a double comparative design in which they review job applicants originating from Muslim majority countries, that do and do not signal closeness to Islam in their resumes. This allows the researchers to untangle and view Anti-Muslim discrimination versus origin based or proximity based discrimination across these 5 nations and Muslim majority countries they studied. Researchers refer to this origin or proximity based discrimination as "Muslim by default effect." They also dubbed a show of closeness to Islam, for example volunteering at an association with Muslim connotation, as "disclosed Muslim effect." They collected data on "call-backs by country," "probability to receive positive call back from the employer," and two versions of "probability to receive an invitation from the employer." Their data recorded discrimination against those "originating from countries with a substantial Muslim population," and also found that when this was intersected with Muslims "signaling closeness to Islam," there was compounded hiring practice discrimination. They conclude that this discrimination contributes to the severe disadvantage faced by ethnic and religious minorities, including in the labor market. Germany, and Spain were also examined but were not found to have the same discrimination in hiring practice. This study did not formally assess institutional effects.

A literature review states that there are studies in France and Germany, suggesting Muslim men and Muslim women face labor market disadvantages.

==== Other grounds ====
Furthermore, European studies provide evidence for hiring discrimination based on former unemployment, trade union membership, beauty, HIV, religion, youth delinquency, former underemployment, and former depression. Employment at the army is found to have no causal effect on employment opportunities.

=== North America ===
==== Canada ====
===== Ethnicity =====
Research conducted in 2010 by University of Toronto researchers Philip Oreopoulos and Diane Dechief has found that resumes featuring English-sounding names sent to Canadian employers were more than 35% more likely to receive an interview call-back as compared to resumes featuring Chinese, Indian or Greek-sounding names. The study, supported by Metropolis BC., a federally funded diversity-research agency, was conducted to investigate why recent immigrants are struggling much more in the Canadian job markets than immigrants in the 1970s. In order to test this hypothesis, dozens of identical resumes, with only the name of the applicant changed, was sent to employers in Toronto, Vancouver and Montreal. Of the three cities surveyed, Metro Vancouver employers, both large and small, were the least swayed by the ethnicity of an applicants' name. Resumes submitted to employers here were just 20% more likely to get a callback than those with Chinese or Indian names. Through interviews with Canadian employers, the researchers found that name-based discrimination on application forms were a result of time-pressed employers being concerned that individuals with foreign backgrounds would have inadequate English-language and social skills for the Canadian marketplace.

===== Disability =====
In 2006, just over one-half (51%) of persons with disabilities were employed, compared to three in four persons without disabilities.

Employment rates are lower (under 40%) for persons with developmental and communication disabilities, whereas employment rates are closer to average for persons with a hearing impairment or for those who have problems with pain, mobility, and agility.

Data from Statistics Canada's Participation and Activity Limitation Survey (PALS) show that, in 2006, one in four unemployed persons with a disability and one in eight persons with a disability who are not in the workforce believe that, in the past five years, they've been refused a job because of their disability. One in twelve employed persons with a disability also reported that they experienced discrimination, with the proportion of discrimination "increasing with the severity of activity limitations".

===== Gender and sexual orientation =====
According to 2011 Statistics Canada data, the gender wage gap in Ontario is 26% for full-time, full-year workers. For every $1.00 earned by a male worker, a female worker earns 74 cents. In 1987, when the Pay Equity Act was passed, the gender wage gap was 36%. It is estimated that as much as 10 to 15% of the gender wage gap is due to discrimination.

===== Religion =====
In Canada, a 2019 journal article drew data from the 2011 National Household Survey which after filtering for labor market relevant responders, had a sample size of 192,652 records. White Christian women were used as a baseline for the study. After comparing many ethno-religious groups against this baseline, they found that many ethno-religious groups, with the exception of Arab and Black Muslim women were as likely as White women to obtain managerial and professional jobs. Aside from those named exceptions, the study found Muslim women had the highest likelihood of unemployment and being disadvantaged. The article concludes that while it's possible that "discouraged women" and "surplus education" could explain low labor market participation and employment rates in Muslim women, the most likely cause is discrimination based on "visibility and religious affiliation" The article describes this visibility as "physical visibility and cultural proximity the dominant group [of Muslims]." This means that atop previously confirmed racial discrimination, racialized Muslims face the added penalty of being visibly and proximally Muslim. The study claims this is likely due to a rise in Islamophobia. A European study from the same year calls this "Muslim by default effect."

==== United States ====
===== Ethnicity =====
The U.S. is one of the countries that have noticeable racial inequalities. Such inequalities are shown mostly between African Americans and whites. Although it is still uncertain if the reason behind the disparity leads to racism exclusively, different forms of interracial inequalities take place in the competitive labour market.

By means of their seminal correspondence experiment, Marianne Bertrand and Sendhil Mullainathan, showed that applications from job candidates with white-sounding names got 50 percent more callbacks for interviews than those with African-American-sounding names in the United States at the start of this millennium. Similarly, a 2009 study found that black applicants for low-wage jobs in New York City were half as likely as whites to get callbacks with equivalent resumes, interpersonal skills, and demographic characteristics. The same study also examines discrimination in the low-wage labour market, since the low-wage market contains a large proportion of service industries that require a higher demand for "soft skills." With a concern that employers might judge the applicant more subjectively in the low-wage labour market, the study discovers a minor sign of discrimination that black and Latino applicants were routinely channeled into positions requiring less customer contact and more manual work than their white counterparts. Employers appeared to see more potential in white applicants, and they more commonly considered white applicants as a better fit for jobs with higher responsibilities.

A Current Population Survey in 2006 noted that African-Americans were twice as likely to be unemployed than whites. "Black men spend significantly more time searching for work"; and even when they are working, they have less stable employment, diminishing their work experience".

Discrimination goes beyond the hiring process. "Controlling for parental background, education, work experience, tenure, and training, white men earn roughly 15% more than comparable blacks."

African Americans also face unfair discharges. Generally, people do not pay as much attention to unfair discharges as much as the hiring process. However, since there is barely any professional certification for supervisors, which is a crucial occupation for the process of both hiring and discharge in all industries, injustices might occur when a supervisor is consciously or unconsciously biased against certain racial groups. The Ohio Employment Discrimination Studies examined 8,051 claims of employment discrimination closed by the Ohio Civil Rights Commission (OCRC) from 1985 through 2001. The study is conducted to find a correlation between racial discrimination during the process of hiring and discharge. The study concludes that there is a significantly higher vulnerability of African American employees to discriminatory discharges, such as an African American employee would face a higher possibility of discharge by engaging in similar disruptive behavior in the workplace than a non-Black employee would face.

A study in 2014 shows that African American face more employment scrutiny than their white coworkers. In the study, a legal memorandum written by a hypothetical third-year associate was offered to two groups of partners who were from twenty-four law firms. The first group was told that the author was African American while the second group was told that the author to be a Caucasian. The study not only resulted in a lower average score graded by the first group (3.2 to 4.1 on a scale from 1 to 5,) but also the viewers inserted more captious grammar and spelling errors significantly when they believed the writer to be African American.

Within each race, darker complexion is also discriminated against. Multiple studies have found that lighter skin blacks "tend to have superior incomes and life chances". "Chicanos with lighter skin color and more european features had higher socioeconomic status" and "black Hispanics suffer close to ten times the proportionate income loss due to differential treatment of given characteristics than white Hispanics".

The wage disparities between African American and Caucasian workers is a substantial expression of racial discrimination in the workplace. The historical trend of wage inequality between African American workers and Caucasian workers from 1940s to 1960s can be characterized by alternating periods of progress and retrenchment. From 1940 to 1950, the wage ratio for African-American men in comparison to white men rose from 0.43 to 0.55. From 1950 to 1960, however, the ratios only rose by 0.3, ending the decade at 0.58. The period from 1960 to 1980 has considerable progress for the wage ratio with an increase of 15 percent. This improvement was mostly due to the bans of discrimination from 1960 and abolition of Jim Crow Laws by 1975. The late 1970s marked the beginning of a dramatic rise in overall wage inequality. A study shows that while both the wage of less educated and well-educated workers after 1979 declines, the wages of the least educated workers begin to fall dramatically faster.

Over the past few decades, researchers argue around the explanation for the wage gap between the African American and Caucasian workers. James Heckman, a Nobel Prize-winning American economist, leads the argument that labour market discrimination is no longer a first-order quantitative problem in American society, and supports the idea that blacks bring skill deficiencies to the labour market and cause the wage gap. Heckman's argument is based on a series of papers utilizing the Armed Forces Qualifications Test (AFQT) scores reported in the National Longitudinal Survey of Youth. The papers support that interracial wage inequality is due to pre-labour market inequality by examining the basic human capital model. The papers utilize empirically based approach suggesting that an individual's position in the skill distribution is influenced by the decisions made reconsidering the cost and benefit of acquiring certain jobs. The researchers who support the approach believe that in a competitive labour market individuals of equal ability is rewarded equally.

On the other hand, the researchers who favor the explanation that racial discrimination is the reason that causes wage inequality argues against the reliability of AFQT. AFQT is a test based on a single dataset and intended to predict performance in military service. The predictions of the analysis have not been replicated by studies that employ different measures of cognitive skills, and it yields inconsistent results on pre-labor market skill differences between races. Therefore, it is unable to summarize that the impact of pre-labour inequality would directly cause skill deficiencies.

A landmark field experiment by Bertrand and Mullainathan (2004) provided strong empirical evidence of racial bias in hiring practices. The researchers sent out fictitious resumes to real job postings, randomly assigning either African American–sounding names (e.g., Jamal, Lakisha) or White-sounding names (e.g., Greg, Emily) to otherwise identical resumes. Resumes with White-sounding names received approximately 50% more callbacks than those with Black-sounding names, suggesting that even in the absence of explicit prejudice, implicit racial bias can significantly affect employment decisions.

===== Sex =====
Women have had a long history of discrimination in the workplace. Feminist theory points to the concept of a family wage—a rate substantial enough to support a man and his family—as the explanation to why women's labor is cheap, claiming it preserves "male dominance and women's dependence in the family". Though there has been legislation such as the Equal Pay Act that combat gender discrimination, the implications of the act are limited. "As an amendment to the Fair Labor Standard Act, it exempted employers in agriculture, hotels, motels, restaurants, and laundries, as well as professional, managerial, and administrative personnel, outside salesworkers, and private household workers". Because high concentrations of women work in these fields (34.8% of employed women of color and 5.1% of white women as private household workers, 21.6% and 13.8% working in service jobs, 9.3% and 3.7% as agricultural workers, and 8.1% and 17.2% as administrative workers), "nearly 45% of all employed women, then, appear to have been exempt from the Equal Pay Act".

The hourly wage rate for women is 65% of that of men, and annual earnings of full-time employed women are 71% of those of men. Along the male wage distribution, the average woman lies at the 33rd percentile.

Within women, another level of discrimination takes place among mothers. Historically, this inequality stems from the belief that mothers are less productive at work. Visibly pregnant women are often judged as less committed to their jobs, less dependable, and more emotional compared to women who are not visibly pregnant. A study conducted in 1998 showed that the wage rates of women without children were 81.3% of men's pay, but 73.4% of men's pay for women with children. An audit study in 2007 found that, childless women receive 2.1 times as many callbacks than equally qualified mothers. Though it does not receive as much attention as the gender gap, motherhood is a significant quality that is discriminated against. In fact, the pay gap between mothers and non-mothers is larger than the pay gap between men and women.

===== Gender and sexual orientation =====
The Williams Institute, a national think tank at UCLA School of Law, released a 2011 report that has identified sexual orientation and gender identification discrimination in the US workplace. According to the report, between 15 and 43% of lesbian, gay, bisexual, or transgender workers have experienced being fired, denied promotions, or harassed due to their sexual orientation or gender identification. Additionally, 27 states do not have statewide laws for protecting LGBTQ people from discrimination based on sexual orientation or gender identity in employment, housing, and public accommodations. Wisconsin and New Hampshire prohibit discrimination based on sexual orientation but not gender identity. On October 4, 2017, Attorney General Jeff Sessions announced that the United States Department of Justice will no longer provide employment protection to transgender individuals under Title VII of the Civil Rights Act of 1964, reversing the position of former Attorney General Eric Holder, during the Obama administration. However, on June 15, 2020, the U.S. Supreme Court in a 6–3 decision concluded that Title VII protects gay, lesbian, and transgender individuals from sex-based discrimination in the workplace. In January 2025, President Trump issued executive orders rescinding federal civil rights protections and DEI initiatives, eliminating safeguards against LGBTQ+ discrimination.

===== Age =====
Most age discrimination occurs among the older workers when employers hold negative stereotypes about them. Though evidence on declines in productivity is inconsistent, "other evidence points to declines in acuteness of vision or hearing, ease of memorization, computational speed, etc.". Another factor employers take into consideration is the higher cost of health or life insurance for older workers.

A 2013 report was completed by the AARP to identify the impact of age discrimination in the workplace. Of those 1,500 individuals who responded to AARP's 2013 Staying Ahead of the Curve survey, almost 64% of those over 45–74 said they have seen or have experienced age discrimination in the workplace. Of those, 92% say it was somewhat or very common in their workplace. "In 1963 the unemployment rate for men over age 55 was a full percentage point higher (4.5 percent) than for men aged 35–54 (3.5%)." Average durations of unemployment are higher for older workers as well—21 weeks for men over age 45 as opposed to 14 weeks for men under 45.

===== Criminal records =====
Laws restricting employment discrimination for persons who have been convicted of criminal offenses vary significantly by state. The U.S. Equal Employment Opportunity Commission has issued guidelines for employers intended to prevent criminal record discrimination from being used as a proxy to effect unlawful racial discrimination.

===== Religion =====
In the US, a journal article using pooled data from a 2007 and 2011 probability sample of Muslims living in the United States, found that there was a key difference in the employment of hijab-wearing Muslim women versus non-hijab wearing Muslims but little difference in the employment of non-hijab wearing Muslim women and non-Muslim women; it calls this the "hijab effect". The study controls for demographic variables, migration history, human capital, and house hold composition to analyze "inter-religious" differences and "intra-Muslim" differences. Intra-Muslim differences looks at non-hijab wearing Muslim women and hijab wearing Muslim women. The article states that "conservative gender ideology" is not correlated with Muslim women's employment in the US. It suggests two possible reasons for the hijab effect. The first possible reason is employers discriminating against hijab wearing Muslim women during the hiring process. The second possible reason is that career oriented or job-driven Muslim women may feel less free to wear hijab or may not wear it to display their "careerism or avoid discrimination." The study can not provide direct evidence for employment discrimination. The researchers conclude that the study suggests non-structural discrimination.

Another study in the United States rans a field experiment with women posing as job applicants/"confederates" and interaction "observers." Each pair of observer and confederate entered eight different locations serving a similar demographic. The observer acted as clientele and timed interactions, while the confederate asked questions based on a script and training. Half of the time confederate wore hijab and the other times they did not wear hijab. Using this data the study concluded that there is formal and interpersonal discrimination against hijab wearing Muslim women. Formal discrimination, also referred to as overt discrimination, defined as conscious, explicit biases against a protected group. This was measured by. Interpersonal discrimination, also referred to as covert discrimination, defined as being less cordial, more disinterested and curt with protected groups.

== See also ==
- Discrimination (Employment and Occupation) Convention, 1958
- Economic discrimination
- Equal Remuneration Convention, 1951
- Involuntary unemployment
- Labour and employment law
- Marriage bars
- Psychological impact of discrimination on health

== Bibliography ==
- Pager, Devah (2009). Marked: Race, Crime, and Finding Work in an Era of Mass Incarceration. University of Chicago Press. ISBN 978-0-226-64484-4.
- Papa, Michael J.; Tom D. Daniels; Barry K. Spiker (2007). Organizational Communication: Perspectives and Trends (5 ed.). SAGE. ISBN 978-1-4129-1684-4.
- Trentham, Susan; Laurie Larwood (1998). "Gender Discrimination and the Workplace: An Examination of Rational Bias Theory". Sex Roles. 38 (112): 1–28. doi:10.1023/A:1018782226876. S2CID 141445242.
- Leila Schneps and Coralie Colmez, Math on trial. How numbers get used and abused in the courtroom, Basic Books, 2013. ISBN 978-0-465-03292-1. (Sixth chapter: "Math error number 6: Simpson's paradox. The Berkeley sex bias case: discrimination detection").
- Wadhwa, Vivek (6 June 2006). "The True Cost of Discrimination". BusinessWeek Online. Archived from the original on 24 May 2009.
- Muhs, Gabriella Gutiérrez y; Harris, Angela P.; Flores Niemann, Yolanda; González, Carmen G. (2012). Presumed incompetent: the intersections of race and class for women in academia. Boulder, Colorado: University Press of Colorado. ISBN 978-0-87421-922-7.
- Bose, Bijetri, et al. "Protecting Adults with Caregiving Responsibilities from Workplace Discrimination: Analysis of National Legislation." Journal of Marriage and Family, vol. 82, no. 3, June 2020, pp. 953–64. EBSCOhost, https://doi.org/10.1111/jomf.12660.
