= Duncan Kennedy (legal philosopher) =

American legal scholar (born 1942)

- Born: 1942 (age 83–84); Washington, D.C., U.S.

Academic background
- Education: Harvard University (BA); Yale University (LLB)

Academic work
- School or tradition: Critical theory critical legal studies
- Institutions: Harvard University
- Main interests: Legal philosophy
- Notable ideas: Critical legal studies
- Influenced: Louis Michael Seidman, Gary Peller

Duncan Kennedy (born 1942) is an American legal scholar and held the Carter Professorship of General Jurisprudence at Harvard Law School until 2015. Now emeritus, he is best known as one of the founders of the critical legal studies movement.

== Education and early career ==
Kennedy received an A.B. from Harvard College in 1964 and then worked for two years in the CIA operation that controlled the National Student Association. In 1966 he rejected his "cold war liberalism" and quit the CIA and in 1970 earned an LL.B. from Yale Law School. After completing a clerkship with Supreme Court Justice Potter Stewart, Kennedy joined the Harvard Law School faculty, becoming a full professor in 1976. In March 2010 he received an Honoris Causa (honorary degree) Ph.D. title from the University of the Andes in Colombia. In June 2011, he also received an Honoris Causa Ph.D. title from the Université du Québec à Montréal in Canada.

Kennedy has been a member of the American Civil Liberties Union since 1967.

== Academic work and influence ==
In 1977, together with Karl Klare, Mark Kelman, Roberto Unger, and other scholars, Kennedy established the critical legal studies movement. Outside legal academia, he is mostly known for his monograph Legal Education and the Reproduction of Hierarchy, famous for its trenchant critique of American legal education.

== Bibliography ==
- The Rise and Fall of Classical Legal Thought (privately printed in 1975, republished by Beard Books in 2006)
- "Form and Substance in Private Law Adjudication," 89 Harvard Law Review 1685 (1976)
- "Freedom and Constraint in Adjudication: A Critical Phenomenology," 36 Journal of Legal Education 518 (1986)
- Sexy Dressing, etc. (Harvard University Press, 1993)
- A Critique of Adjudication [fin de siècle] (Harvard University Press, 1997)
- "A Semiotics of Critique," 22 Cardozo Law Review 1147 (2001)
- "Thoughts on Coherence, Social Values and National Tradition in Private Law," in Hesselink, ed., The Politics of a European Civil Code (Kluwer Law International, Amsterdam, 2006)
- "The Bitter Ironies of Williams v. Walker-Thomas Furniture Co. in the First Year Law School Curriculum," Buffalo Law Review, Vol. 71, No. 2 (April 2023), available at SSRN: https://ssrn.com/abstract=4371842

== See also ==
- Indeterminacy debate in legal theory
- List of deconstructionists
- List of law clerks for the eighth seat of the Supreme Court of the United States
- Philosophy of law
