= Stefančič =

Stefančič is a South Slavic surname. Notable people with the surname include:

- Jean Stefancic, American legal academic, professor and critical race theorist
- Romina Stefancic (born 1978), Slovenian-Canadian rower
