= Chandra Lekha Sriram =

Chandra Lekha Sriram (1971–2018) was Professor of Law at the University of London, School of Oriental and African Studies (SOAS). She has written and lectured widely on conflict prevention, post-conflict peacebuilding, human rights, international criminal law, and transitional justice. Her most recent monograph, Peace as governance: Power-sharing, armed groups, and contemporary peace negotiations (2008), offered a comparative critical examination of the use of power-sharing incentives in peace processes in Colombia, Sri Lanka, and Sudan. Previous monographs on transitional justice and international criminal accountability, Confronting past human rights violations: Justice versus peace in times of transition (2004) and Globalizing Justice for mass atrocities: A revolution in accountability (2005); (reviewed in Human Rights Quarterly) examined transitional justice and internationalized and externalized criminal justice processes in or for Sierra Leone, Timor-Leste, El Salvador, Honduras, Sri Lanka, South Africa, and Argentina.

== Book credits ==
Professor Sriram has co-edited or co-authored numerous books on human rights and armed conflict, including

- War, Conflict, and Human Rights: Theory and practice (2009, with Olga Martin-Ortega and Johanna Herman) reviewed in Perspectives on Terrorism and in Human Rights Quarterly.
- Her co-edited volume Peace versus justice? The dilemma of power-sharing in Africa (2009/2010, with Suren Pillay) won a CHOICE Outstanding Academic Title award in 2011.
- She co-edited International Law and International Relations: Bridging Theory and Practice (with Thomas Biersteker, Peter Spiro, and Veronica Raffo, 2006)
- Surviving field research: Working in violent and difficult situations (with John C. King, Julie A. Mertus, Olga Martin-Ortega, and Johanna Herman, 2009).
- Managing armed conflicts in the 21st Century (with Adekeye Adebajo, 2001)
- From promise to practice: Strengthening UN capacities for the prevention of violent conflict (with Karin Wermester, 2003)
- Exploring subregional conflict: Opportunities for conflict prevention (with Zoe Nielsen, 2004)

== University of East London School of Law ==
Professor Sriram was professor of human rights at the University of East London School of Law from 2005–2010, where she founded and directed the Centre on Human Rights in Conflict, an interdisciplinary research centre devoted to work on the intersection between human rights and conflict prevention, resolution, and peacebuilding. As director of the Centre, she was principal investigator on several larger research grants, including, a large research grant from the British Academy, on Rule of law in African countries emerging from violent conflict: Critical issues and cases (2007–2009), which produced the edited volume Peacebuilding and Rule of Law in Africa: Just peace? (with Olga Martin-Ortega and Johanna Herman, 2010) European Union Framework VII project on Just and Durable Peace by Piece (led by University of Lund, 2008–2011), and a grant from the United States Institute of Peace (with the Norwegian Human Rights Centre, 2010–2012) on Transitional Justice as Peacebuilding.

== United Nations Development Programme ==
Professor Sriram has consulted for the United Nations Development Programme, Crisis Management International, Human Rights Internet, the Centre for Humanitarian Dialogue, and other organizations. She was team leader of a team that produced, for the United Nations Development Programme, a guidance note on governance and conflict prevention and early recovery, and is on the UNDP experts' roster as a human rights expert. From 2008-2010 she was chair of the Human Rights section of the International Studies Association.

== International Peace Institute ==
Professor Sriram directed the conflict prevention project at the International Peace Academy (now the International Peace Institute, a think tank which works primarily with the United Nations) from 2000-2003, holding numerous conferences, workshops, and seminars with United Nations Security Council member state representatives, and key departments, funds and agencies of the United Nations, academics, and representatives of non-governmental organizations. From 2003-2005, she was a lecturer in the School of International Relations at the University of St. Andrews, after which she was a visiting associate professor in 2005 at the University of Maryland School of Law.
