= Gary Peller =

- Born: 1955 (age 69–70); New York City, New York, United States

Philosophical work
- Era: 20th-/21st-century philosophy
- Region: Western philosophy
- School: Critical theory
- Main interests: Legal philosophy
- Notable ideas: Critical legal studies, critical race theory

Gary Peller (born 1955) is a professor of law at Georgetown University Law Center and a prominent member of the critical legal studies and critical race theory movements.

== Education and early career ==
Peller received a Bachelor of Arts degree from Emory University in 1977 and a Juris Doctor degree from Harvard Law School where he served as a member of the Harvard Law Review. Peller then clerked for Morris Lasker, a judge of the United States District Court for the Southern District of New York. He is currently a member of the Maryland state bar.

== Academic work and influence ==
Peller was one of the central figures at the Conference on Critical Legal Studies. With Kimberlé Crenshaw, Peller co-authored a widely cited article, "The Contradictions of Mainstream Constitutional Theory", published in the UCLA Law Review, and co-edited one of the standard texts in critical race theory. Peller is among the irrationalist branch of the critical legal studies movement, arguing that there is no neutral or objective rationality but rather what is understood as knowledge is a socially contingent result of prevailing power dynamics. He is also known for his debate with Mark Tushnet where he defended the critical race theorists' use of personal narrative rather than conventional arguments in their articles.

== Selected bibliography ==
- Gary Peller & Mark V. Tushnet, State Action and a New Birth of Freedom, 92 Geo. L.J. 779-817 (2004).
- Gary Peller, A Subversive Strand of the Warren Court, 59 Wash. & Lee L. Rev. 1141-1165 (2002).
- Kimberle Crenshaw, Neil Gotanada, Gary Peller, Kendall Thomas, Critical Race Theory, The Key Writings that Formed the Movement. 1995, The New Press
- “The Ideology of the Substantive Criminal Law,” Summer Faculty Colloquia, Georgetown University Law Center,” July, 2001.
- Kimberle Crenshaw & Gary Peller, The Contradictions of Mainstream Constitutional Theory,” 45 U.C.L.A. L. Rev. 1683 (1998).
- “Public Imperialism and Private Resistance: Progressive Possibilities of the New Private Law,” 73 Denver L. Rev. 1001 (1996).
- “Cultural Imperialism and Race,” in A. Sarat, ed., Forty Years After Brown, Oxford University Press (1996).
- “Criminal Law, Race, and the Idea of Bias: Transcending the Critical Tools of the Sixties,” 67 Tulane L. Rev. 2231 (1993).
- “Proof, Myth and Law: The Social Meaning of the Rodney King Verdict,” 70 Denver L. Rev. 548 (1993) (co-authored with Kimberle Crenshaw).
- “The Discourse of Constitutional Degradation,” 81 Georgetown L. J. 313 (1992).
- “Notes Toward a Postmodern Nationalism,” 72 Illin. L. Rev. 664 (1992).
- “The New Public Law Movement: Moderation as a Postmodern Cultural Form,” 89 Michigan L. Rev. 231 (1991)
- “Race Consciousness,” 1990 Duke L.J. 758. Reprinted in After Identity, D. Danielson & K. Engle, eds., Routledge (1994) and in Critical Race Theory: A Reader (K. Crenshaw, N. Gotanda, G. Peller, & K. Thomas, eds. New Press (1996).
- “Reason and the Mob: The Politics of Representation,” 2 Tikkun 28 (July/Aug. 1987). Reprinted in A Tikkun Anthology (M. Lerner, ed. 1991).
- “The Metaphysics of American Law,” 73 Cal. L. Rev. 1151 (1985), reprinted in Critical Legal Studies, J. Boyle ed. (1991).

== See also ==
- Indeterminacy debate in legal theory
- List of thinkers influenced by deconstruction
