= Richard Delgado =

American legal scholar (born 1939)

- Born: October 6, 1939 (age 87)
- Education: University of Washington (BA); University of California, Berkeley (JD)
- Occupation: Professor
- Employer(s): University of California, Los Angeles; University of Pittsburgh; University of Colorado; Seattle University; University of Alabama
- Known for: Critical race theory
- Spouse: Jean Stefancic

Richard Delgado (born October 6, 1939) is an American legal scholar, one the key founders of critical race theory, as described in foundational legal scholarship, along with Derrick Bell and Alan Freeman. Delgado is currently a Distinguished Professor of Law at Seattle University School of Law. Previously, he was the John J. Sparkman Chair of Law at the University of Alabama School of Law. He has written and co-authored numerous articles and books, many with legal scholar and frequent collaborator Jean Stefancic, his spouse. He is also notable for his scholarship on hate speech and for introducing storytelling into legal scholarship.

== Biography ==
The son of a Mexican-American father who immigrated to the United States by himself at the age of 15, Delgado grew up in a migratory household and attended public schools as a child. He earned an A.B. in philosophy and mathematics at the University of Washington, and then attended the UC-Berkeley School of Law, where he earned a J.D. and served as an editor of the California Law Review.

Delgado previously taught at the University of Alabama School of Law, where he held the John J. Sparkman Chair of Law and taught courses in race and civil rights. Earlier, he also taught at UCLA Law School for eight years and the University of Colorado for fourteen. In 1998, he served as the Wayne Morse Chair of Law and Politics, established in honor of the late former Senator, at the University of Oregon.

He currently teaches at Seattle University School of Law, where he is a distinguished professor of law.

== Selected bibliography ==
=== Books ===
- Delgado, Richard; Lederer, Laura (1995). The price we pay: the case against racist speech, hate propaganda, and pornography. New York: Hill and Wang. ISBN 978-0-80901577-1.
- ——— (1995). The Rodrigo chronicles: conversations about America and race. New York: New York University Press. ISBN 978-0-81471863-6.
- ——— (1996). The coming race war?: and other apocalyptic tales of America after affirmative action and welfare. New York: New York University Press. ISBN 978-0-81471877-3.
- ———; Stefancic, Jean (1997). Must we defend Nazis? hate speech, pornography, and the new First Amendment. New York: New York University Press. ISBN 978-0-58534679-3.
- ———; ——— (1997). Critical white studies: looking behind the mirror. Philadelphia: Temple University Press. ISBN 978-1-56639532-8.
- ——— (1999). When equality ends: stories about race and resistance. Boulder, CO: Westview Press. ISBN 978-0-81333578-0.
- ———; Harris, Angela P.; Stefancic, Jean; Perea, Juan F.; Wildman, Stephanie M. (2000). Race and races: cases and resources for a diverse America (2nd ed.). St. Paul, MN: West Group. ISBN 978-0-31422709-6.
- ———; Stefancic, Jean (2004). Understanding words that wound. Boulder, CO: Westview Press. ISBN 978-0-81334139-2.
- ——— (2005). Justice at war: civil liberties and civil rights during times of crisis. New York City, NY: New York University Press. ISBN 9780814719565.
- ———; Stefancic, Jean (2011). The Latino/a condition: a critical reader (2nd ed.). New York: New York University Press. ISBN 978-0-81472040-0.
- ——— (2012). Critical race theory an introduction (2nd ed.). New York: New York University Press. ISBN 978-0-81472135-3.

=== Journal articles ===
- Delgado, Richard (1980). "Active Rationality in Judicial Review." Minnesota Law Review. University of Minnesota Law School. via HeinOnline. 64: 467–521.
- ——— (March 1984). "The imperial scholar: reflections on a review of civil rights literature". University of Pennsylvania Law Review. 132 (3): 561–578. doi:10.2307/3311882. JSTOR 3311882. S2CID 141979963. SSRN 1992111.
- ——— (August 1989). "Storytelling for oppositionists and others: a plea for narrative". Michigan Law Review. 87 (8): 2411–41. doi:10.2307/1289308. JSTOR 1289308. SSRN 1577362.
- ——— (April 1992). "The imperial scholar revisited: how to marginalize outsider writing, ten years later". University of Pennsylvania Law Review. 140 (4): 1349–72. doi:10.2307/3312406. JSTOR 3312406. S2CID 142597778. SSRN 2097942. PDF.
- ——— (2010). "Rodrigo's portent: California and the coming neocolonial order". Washington University Law Review. 87 (6): 1293–1344. PDF.
- ——— (April 1992). "Rodrigo's chronicle". Yale Law Journal (review essay). 101 (6): 1357–83. doi:10.2307/796927. JSTOR 796927.
- ——— (March 2012). "Recent writing on law and happiness" (PDF). Iowa Law Review (review essay). 97 (3): 913–30.
- ——— (November 2012). "Four reservations on civil rights reasoning by analogy: the case of Latinos and other Nonblack groups". Columbia Law Review. 112 (7): 1883–1915. JSTOR 41708167. Archived from the original on January 15, 2013. PDF.
