= Angela P. Harris =

American legal scholar (born 1961)

- Born: 1961 (age 64–65)
- Awards: 2008 Clyde Ferguson Award from the Association of American Law Schools Minority Section

Academic background
- Education: University of Chicago; University of Michigan

Academic work
- Main interests: Legal scholar
- Notable ideas: Feminist legal scholarship

Angela P. Harris (born 1961) is an American legal scholar at UC Davis School of Law, in the fields of critical race theory, feminist legal scholarship, and criminal law. She held the position of professor of law at UC Berkeley School of Law, joining the faculty in 1988. In 2009, Harris joined the faculty of the State University of New York at Buffalo Law School as a visiting professor. In 2010, she also assumed the role of acting vice dean for research and faculty development. In 2011, she accepted an offer to join the faculty at the UC Davis School of Law, and began teaching as a professor of law in the 2011–12 academic year.

== Biography ==
Harris earned a BA from the University of Michigan in 1981, and her MA (1983) and JD (1986) from the University of Chicago. She clerked for Judge Joel Flaum of the United States Court of Appeals for the Seventh Circuit, and worked as an attorney for the law firm of Morrison and Foerster. She was tenured at Berkeley in 1992.

== Recognition ==
Harris has won the Rutter Award for Teaching Distinction (2003; established 1995), and the 2003 Matthew O. Tobriner Public Service Award, a San Francisco Bay Area award, for commitment to academic diversity and legal mentoring. In 2008, Harris won the Clyde Ferguson Award from the Association of American Law Schools Minority Section. Alongside Kimberlé Crenshaw, Harris has been recognized as one of the leading scholars of critical race theory.

== Selected bibliography ==
=== Books ===
- Harris, Angela P.; Bartlett, Katharine (1998). Gender and law: theory, doctrine, commentary. New York: Aspen Law & Business. ISBN 9781567067408.
- Harris, Angela P.; Delgado, Richard; Stefancic, Jean; Perea, Juan F.; Wildman, Stephanie M. (2000). Race and races: cases and resources for a diverse America (2nd ed.). St. Paul, Minnesota: West Group. ISBN 9780314227096.
- Harris, Angela P.; Valdes, Francisco; McCristal Culp, Jerome (2002). Crossroads, directions, and a new critical race theory. Philadelphia: Temple University Press. ISBN 9781566399302.
- Harris, Angela P.; Jordan, Emma Coleman (2006). When markets fail: race and economics: cases and materials. New York: Foundation Press. ISBN 9781587789557.
- Harris, Angela P.; Jordan, Emma Coleman (2006). A woman's place is in the marketplace: gender and economics: cases and materials. New York: Foundation Press. ISBN 9781587789564.
- Harris, Angela P.; Jordan, Emma Coleman (2006). Cultural economics: markets and culture: cases and materials. New York, New York St. Paul, Minnesota: Foundation Press Thomson/West. ISBN 9781587789571.
- Harris, Angela P.; Jordan, Emma Coleman (2011). Economic justice: race, gender, identity and economics: cases and materials (2nd ed.). New York, New York St. Paul, Minnesota: Foundation Press Thomson/West. ISBN 9781599419589.
- Harris, Angela P.; Muhs, Gabriella Gutiérrez y; Flores Niemann, Yolanda; González, Carmen G. (2012). Presumed incompetent: the intersections of race and class for women in academia. Boulder, Colorado: University Press of Colorado. ISBN 9780874219227.
- Harris, Angela P. (2013). Race and equality law. Farnham, Surrey, England Burlington, Vermont: Ashgate. ISBN 9781409437185.
- Harris, Angela P.; Lee, Cynthia (2014). Criminal law: cases and materials. St. Paul, Minnesota: West Academic Publishing. ISBN 9780314282866.

=== Chapters in books ===
- Harris, Angela P. (1996). "Forcible rape, date rape, and communicative sexuality: a legal perspective". In Francis, Leslie (ed.). Date rape: feminism, philosophy, and the law. University Park: Pennsylvania State University Press. ISBN 9780271014296.
- Harris, Angela P. (1999). "Women of color and the law". In Taylor, Betty W.; Munro, Robert John; Rush, Sharon (eds.). Feminist jurisprudence, women and the law: critical essays, research agenda, and bibliography. Littleton, Colorado: F.B. Rothman. ISBN 9780837712246.
- Harris, Angela P. (2001). "Foreword". In Weyrauch, Walter O. (ed.). Gypsy law Romani legal traditions and culture. Berkeley Los Angeles London: University of California Press. pp. ix–xiv. ISBN 9780520221864.
- Harris, Angela P.; Maeda, Donna (2004). "Power and resistance in contemporary legal education". In Kennedy, Duncan (ed.). Legal education and the reproduction of hierarchy: a polemic against the system: a critical edition. New York University Press. ISBN 9780814747780.
- Harris, Angela P. (2012). "Critical race theory". International Encyclopedia of the Social & Behavioral Sciences. Elsevier.

=== Journal articles ===
- Harris, Angela P. (February 1990). "Race and essentialism in feminist legal theory". Stanford Law Review. 42 (3): 581–616. doi:10.2307/1228886. JSTOR 1228886.
- Espinoza, Leslie; Harris, Angela P. (October 1997). "Afterword: Embracing the tar-baby. LatCrit theory and the sticky mess of race". California Law Review. 85 (5): 1585–1645. doi:10.2307/3481066. JSTOR 3481066.
