= Critical legal studies =

School of critical theory developed in the US

Critical legal studies (CLS) is a school of critical theory that developed in the United States during the 1970s. CLS views laws as devised to maintain the status quo of society and thereby codify its biases against marginalized groups.

Despite wide variations in the opinions of critical legal scholars around the world, there is a consensus regarding the key goals of critical legal studies:

- to demonstrate the ambiguity and possible preferential outcomes of supposedly impartial and rigid legal doctrines;
- to publicize historical, social, economic and psychological results of legal decisions;
- to demystify legal analysis and legal culture in order to impose transparency on legal processes so that they earn the general support of socially responsible citizens.

The abbreviations "CLS" and "Crit" are sometimes used to refer to the movement and its adherents.

== Influence ==
Considered "the first movement in legal theory and legal scholarship in the United States to have espoused a committed Left political stance and perspective," critical legal studies was committed to shaping society based on a vision of human personality devoid of the hidden interests and class domination that CLS scholars argued are at the root of liberal legal institutions in the West. According to CLS scholars Duncan Kennedy and Karl Klare, critical legal studies was "concerned with the relationship of legal scholarship and practice to the struggle to create a more humane, egalitarian, and democratic society."

During its period of peak influence, the critical legal studies movement caused considerable controversy within the legal academy. Members such as Roberto Mangabeira Unger have sought to rebuild these institutions as "fragmentary and imperfect expressions of an imaginative scheme of human coexistence rather than just as provisional truce lines in a brutal and amoral conflict." Such members were seen as the most powerful voices and the only way forward for the movement. Unger and other members of the movement continue to try to develop it in new directions, e.g., to make legal analysis the basis of developing institutional alternatives.

== History ==
Although the intellectual origins of the critical legal studies (CLS) can be generally traced to American legal realism, as a distinct scholarly movement CLS fully emerged only in the late 1970s. Many first-wave American CLS scholars entered legal education, having been profoundly influenced by the experiences of the civil rights movement, women's rights movement, and the anti-war movement of the 1960s and 1970s. What started off as a critical stance towards American domestic politics eventually translated into a critical stance towards the dominant legal ideology of modern Western society. Drawing on both domestic theory and the work of European social theorists, the "crits" sought to demystify what they saw as the numerous myths at the heart of mainstream legal thought and practice. The "crits" include Duncan Kennedy, Roberto Unger, Morton Horwitz, Mark Kelman, and Catharine MacKinnon.

The British critical legal studies movement started roughly at a similar time as its American counterpart. However, it centered around a number of conferences held annually, particularly the Critical Legal Conference and the National Critical Lawyers Group. There remain a number of fault lines in the community; between theory and practice, between those who look to Marxism and those who worked on Deconstruction, between those who look to explicitly political engagements and those who work in aesthetics and ethics.

In France, where the legal tradition had been closely guarded by law faculties and watched over by Napoleonic institutions such as the Court of Cassation, the Conseil d'Etat, and the Ecole Nationale de la Magistrature, famed sociologist Pierre Bourdieu caused an uproar when he released his "La Force de la loi, élements pour une sociologie du champ juridique" in 1986 - translated as "The Force of Law: Toward a Sociology of the Juridical Field", in the Hastings Law Journal (1987). It heralded the beginning of continental Critical Legal Studies.

== Relation to American legal realism ==
Critical legal studies had its intellectual origins in the American legal realist movement in the 1930s. Prior to the 1930s, American jurisprudence had been dominated by a formalist account of how courts decide cases, an account which held that judges decide cases on the basis of distinctly legal rules and reasons that justify a unique result. The legal realists argued that statutory and case law is indeterminate, and that appellate courts decide cases not based upon law, but upon what they deem fair in light of the facts of a case. Considered "the most important jurisprudential movement of the 20th century", American legal realism sent a shock through American legal scholarship by undermining the formalist tenets that were long considered a bedrock of jurisprudence.

The influence of legal realism unsettled American jurisprudence for decades. Alan Hunt writes that the period "between the realism of the 1930s and the emergence of critical legal studies in the late 1970s has been a series of unsuccessful attempts to recover from the shock of realism some basis for a legal theory which articulates an image of the objectivity of the legal process, even though the explanation offered by post-realism had to be more complex than that provided by a doctrine of rule-following."

== As a literature and a network ==
The critical legal studies movement emerged in the mid-1970s as a network of leftist law professors in the United States who developed the realist indeterminacy thesis in the service of leftist ideals. According to Roberto Unger, the movement "continued as an organized force only until the late 1980s. Its life as a movement lasted for barely more than a decade."

Duncan Kennedy, a Harvard law professor who along with Unger, was one of the key figures in the movement, has said that, in the early days of critical legal studies, "just about everyone in the network was a white male with some interest in 60s style radical politics or radical sentiment of one kind or another. Some came from Marxist backgrounds — some came from democratic reform." Kennedy has emphasized the twofold nature of critical legal studies, as both a network of leftist scholar/activists and a scholarly literature:

[C]ritical legal studies has two aspects. It’s a scholarly literature and it has also been a network of people who were thinking of themselves as activists in law school politics. Initially, the scholarly literature was produced by the same people who were doing law school activism. Critical legal studies is not a theory. It’s basically this literature produced by this network of people. I think you can identify some themes of the literature, themes that have changed over time.

Scholars affiliated with critical legal studies often identified with the movement in several ways: by including in their articles an opening footnote mentioning the Conference on Critical Legal Studies and providing the organization's contact information, by attending conferences of the CCLS, and by citing the work of fellow critical legal studies scholars. A 1984 bibliography of CLS works, compiled by Duncan Kennedy and Karl Klare and published in the Yale Law Journal, included dozens of authors and hundreds of works.

A 2011 collection of four volumes edited by Costas Douzinas and Colin Perrin, with the assistance of J-M Barreto, compiles the work of the British Critical Legal Studies, including their philosophical mentors. It showcases scholarship elaborated since its origins in the late 1980s in areas such as legal philosophy, literature, psychoanalysis, aesthetics, feminism, gender, sexuality, post-colonialism, race, ethics, politics and human rights.

Prominent participants in the CLS movement include Derrick Bell, Drucilla Cornell, Mary Joe Frug, Mark Kelman, Alan Hunt, Catharine MacKinnon, Paul O'Connell, Peter Fitzpatrick, Morton Horwitz, Jack Balkin, Costas Douzinas, Karl Klare, Peter Gabel, Roberto Unger, Renata Salecl, Mark Tushnet, Louis Michael Seidman, John Strawson and Martha Fineman.

== Intellectual and political context ==
Roberto Unger, a key member of critical legal studies whose influence had continued to be far-reaching in the decades following the movement's decline, has written that the founders of critical legal studies "never meant it to become an ongoing school of thought or genre of writing. They wanted to intervene in a particular circumstance ..."

That circumstance was the dominant practice of legal analysis which Unger calls the "method of reasoned elaboration". A close descendant of nineteenth-century doctrinal formalism, which sought through legal analysis to identify the "inbuilt legal content of a ... free society", the method of reasoned elaboration treated law materials as containing an "ideal element", an inherent legal substance underlying the contradictions and ambiguities in the law's text. Under the practice of reasoned elaboration, this inherent legal substance forms a prescriptive system that judges gradually uncover by reasoning through the policies and principles of law without questioning the "basic institutional arrangements of the market economy, of democratic politics, and of civil society outside the market and the state".

Reasoned elaboration was a pernicious influence for several reasons, Unger and others argued: it de-emphasized the contingent nature of law as a product of deals and compromise, instead treating it as containing a coherent prescriptive system that needed simply to be uncovered by legal interpretation; it obscured how judges usurp authority by denying their own role in making law; and finally, reasoned elaboration inhibited the use of law as a mechanism of social change.

In addition to the context of legal interpretation, critical legal studies also emerged in response to its political context, namely a setting in which the social-democratic settlement that was finalized after World War II had become canonical, and active dispute over the organization of society severely declined, effectively enshrining a reigning consensus about social organization that Unger describes as including a "combination of neoliberal orthodoxy, state capitalism, and compensatory redistribution by tax and transfer." Critical legal scholars challenged that consensus and sought to use legal theory as a means to explore alternative forms of social and political organization.

In accordance with the Critical rationalism the German jurist Reinhold Zippelius uses Popper's method of "trial and error" in his 'Legal Philosophy'.

== Themes ==
Although the CLS (like most schools and movements) has not produced a single, monolithic body of thought, several common themes can be generally traced in its adherents' works. These include:

- A first theme is that contrary to the common perception, legal materials (such as statutes and case law) do not completely determine the outcome of legal disputes, or, to put it differently, the law may well impose many significant constraints on the adjudicators in the form of substantive rules, but, in the final analysis, this may often not be enough to bind them to come to a particular decision in a given particular case. Quite predictably, once made, this claim has triggered many lively debates among jurists and legal philosophers, some of which continue to this day (see further indeterminacy debate in legal theory).
- Secondly, there is the idea that all "law is politics". This means that legal decisions are a form of political decision, but not that it is impossible to tell judicial and legislative acts apart. Rather, CLS have argued that while the form may differ, both are based around the construction and maintenance of a form of social space. The argument takes aim at the positivist idea that law and politics can be entirely separated from one another. A more nuanced view has emerged more recently. This rejects the reductivism of 'all law is politics' and instead asserts that the two disciplines are mutually intertwined. There is no 'pure' law or politics, but rather the two forms work together and constantly shift between the two linguistic registers.
- A third strand of the traditional CLS school is that far more often than is usually suspected the law tends to serve the interests of the wealthy and the powerful by protecting them against the demands of the poor and the subaltern (women, ethnic minorities, the working class, indigenous peoples, the disabled, homosexuals, etc.) for greater justice. This claim is often coupled with the legal realist argument that what the law says it does and what it actually tends to do are two different things. Many laws claim to have the aim of protecting the interests of the poor and the subaltern. In reality, they often serve the interests of the power elites. This, however, does not have to be the case, claim the CLS scholars. There is nothing intrinsic to the idea of law that should make it into a vehicle of social injustice. It is just that the scale of the reform that needs to be undertaken to realize this objective is significantly greater than the mainstream legal discourse is ready to acknowledge.
- Furthermore, CLS at times claims that legal materials are inherently contradictory, i.e. the structure of the positive legal order is based on a series of binary oppositions such as, for instance, the opposition between individualism and altruism or formal realizability (i.e. preference for strict rules) and equitable flexibility (i.e. preference for broad standards).
- Finally, CLS questions law's central assumptions, one of which is the Kantian notion of the autonomous individual. The law often treats individual petitioners as having full agency vis-à-vis their opponents. They are able to make decisions based on reason that is detached from political, social, or economic constraints. CLS holds that individuals are tied to their communities, socio-economic class, gender, race, and other conditions of life such that they cease to be autonomous actors in the Kantian mode. Rather, their circumstances determine and therefore limit the choices presented to them. People are not "free"; they are instead determined in large part by social and political structures that surround them.

Increasingly, however, the traditional themes are being superseded by broader and more radical critical insights. Interventions in intellectual property law, human rights, jurisprudence, criminal law, property law, international law, etc., have proved crucial to the development of those discourses. Equally, CLS has introduced new frameworks to the legal field, such as postmodernism, queer theory, literary approaches to law, psychoanalysis, law and aesthetics, and post-colonialism.

== Continued influence ==
Critical legal studies continues as a diverse collection of schools of thought and social movements. The CLS community is an extremely broad group with clusters of critical theorists at law schools and socio-legal studies departments such as Harvard Law School, Georgetown University Law Center, Northeastern University, University at Buffalo, Chicago-Kent College of Law, Birkbeck, University of London, University of New South Wales, University of Melbourne, University of Kent, Carleton University, Keele University, the University of Glasgow, the University of East London among others.

In the American legal academy its influence and prominence seems to have waned in recent years. However, offshoots of CLS, including critical race theory continue to grow in popularity. Associated schools of thought, such as fem-crit, contemporary feminist theory and ecofeminism and critical race theory now play a major role in contemporary legal scholarship. An impressive stream of CLS-style writings has also emerged in the last two decades in the areas of international and comparative law.

In addition, CLS has had a practical effect on legal education, as it was the inspiration and focus of Georgetown University Law Center's alternative first year curriculum, (Termed "Curriculum B", known as "Section 3" within the school). In the UK both Kent and Birkbeck have sought to draw critical legal insights into the legal curriculum, including a critical legal theory based LLM at Birkbeck's School of Law. Various research centers and institutions offer CLS-based taught and research courses in a variety of legal fields including human rights, jurisprudence, constitutional theory and criminal justice.

In New Zealand, the University of Otago Legal Issues Centre was established at the university's law faculty in 2007. In the UK, Christine Schwobel-Patel and Illan Wall founded the Centre for Critical Legal Studies in 2020 at the University of Warwick.

Law and Critique is one of the few UK journals that specifically identifies itself with critical legal theory. In America, The Crit and Unbound: Harvard Journal of the Legal Left are the only journals that continue to explicitly position themselves as platforms for critical legal studies. However, other journals such as Law, Culture and the Humanities, the Harvard Civil Rights-Civil Liberties Law Review, The National Lawyers Guild Review, Social and Legal Studies, and The Australian Feminist Law Journal all published avowedly critical legal research.

There are a number of important critical legal blogs: Critical Legal Thinking and the Marxist Legal Form both publish sophisticated critical legal theory.

== Criticism ==
The stance "law is politics" of Critical legal studies has been criticized for rejecting the distinction between political argument and legal argument. Critical legal studies has been criticized as attacking the rule of law and separation of powers. The indeterminacy thesis stance by Critical legal studies has been criticized to not distinguish between the strong and weak indeterminacy thesis. The strong indeterminacy thesis has been argued by some to be incorrect due to the existence of easy legal cases where some outcomes cannot be legally correct. Constitutionalism argues that the authority of government is limited by constitutional law, in contrast to Critical legal studies, which disputes the constraints by constitution.

== See also ==
- Critical management studies
- International legal theory
- Judicial activism
- Law and literature
