= Legal Education and the Reproduction of Hierarchy =

- Author: Duncan Kennedy
- Language: English
- Publication place: United States

Legal Education and the Reproduction of Hierarchy: A Polemic Against the System is an essay by Duncan Kennedy on legal education in the United States of America. The work is a critique of American legal education and argues that legal education reinforces class, race, and gender inequality.

== Publication history ==
The article was first self-published as a pamphlet in 1983. The pamphlet was subsequently reviewed in several major law journals.

== See also ==
- Critical legal studies
- Philosophy of law
