= Law and Critique =

- Discipline: International law
- Language: English

Publication details
- History: 1990–present
- Publisher: Springer Science+Business Media
- Frequency: Triannually

Standard abbreviations
- ISO 4: Law Crit.

Indexing
- ISSN: 0957-8536

Links
- Journal homepage

Law and Critique (print: ISSN 0957-8536, online: ISSN 1572-8617) is a triannual law journal closely involved with the critical legal studies community. It was established in 1990 and is associated with the Critical Legal Conference. Law and Critique takes a critical perspective on all aspects of legal theory, jurisprudence, and substantive law and covers the influences of a variety of schools of thought into legal scholarship (such as postmodernism, feminism, queer theory, critical race theory, literary approaches to law, psychoanalysis, law and the humanities, law and aesthetics, and post-colonialism).

It is not affiliated with any law school.
