= John Strawson =

British law professor and author

John Strawson is an author and law professor at the University of East London School of Law, where he teaches International law and Middle East Studies. He specialises in the area of law and postcolonialism, with particular reference to the middle east, Islam and international law.

His previous posts include visiting positions at Birzeit University (Palestine) and the Institute of Social Studies (The Hague Netherlands).

One of the themes in the research undertaken by John Strawson is the encounter between western and Islamic law.

He is Director of Law Postgraduate Programmes at the University of East London, and Director of the Centre on Human Rights in Conflict. He is also a director of the Zionist Federation of Great Britain and Ireland.

== Views on Israel ==
According to Strawson, writing in 2006, the use of the term apartheid to describe Israel or Israeli policies has become commonplace in certain liberal and leftist circles. Strawson wrote that this label does not apply to Israel, and suggests that the use of the apartheid analogy is casual, unhistorical, and unhelpful. In 2025, during the Gaza war, Strawson was among 509 signatories of an open letter which refuted accusations that Israel was committing genocide and criticised the International Association of Genocide Scholars for applying the term.

== Books ==
- Encountering Islamic law, by John Strawson, 2000
- Partitioning Palestine: Legal Fundamentalism in the Palestinian-Israeli Conflict. Pluto Press, 2010. ISBN 978-0-7453-2324-4
- (ed.) Law after Ground Zero (London, Sydney, Portland Or: GlassHouse Press/Routledge-Cavendish 2002, reprinted with amendments, 2004) ISBN 978-1-904385-02-8
- (ed.) with Roshan de Silva Wijeyeratne, 'Tracking the Postcolonial in Law', Griffith Law Review, Vol. 12, No. 3 (2003)
