= Barbara Perry (criminologist) =

Canadian criminologist

- Born: 1962 (age 63–64); Picton, Ontario, Canada

Academic background
- Education: BA, 1985, MA, Sociology, 1987, Queen's University at Kingston; PhD, Sociology, 1992, Carleton University
- Thesis: Canada's passive revolution: the Charter of Rights and hegemonic politics in Canada (1992)
- Doctoral advisor: Alan Hunt

Barbara Jean Perry CM (born 1962) is a Canadian criminologist. She is a Full Professor in the Faculty of Social Science and Humanities and founding Director of the Centre on Hate, Bias and Extremism at Ontario Tech University.

== Early life and education ==
Perry was born in 1962 in Picton, Ontario. She graduated from Prince Edward Collegiate Institute in 1981 as co-valedictorian. As she originally wished to pursue a career in law, Perry began her undergraduate studies in political science at Queen's University at Kingston. She earned her Bachelor of Arts degree in 1985 and Master's degree in 1987. Perry then enrolled at Carleton University for her PhD, where she studied under Alan Hunt. She published her thesis in 1992, entitled "Canada's passive revolution: the Charter of Rights and hegemonic politics in Canada."

== Career ==
Perry became involved in hate crime studies in 1993, after noticing a spike in anti-gay activism and anti-gay hate crimes. In July 2004, she accepted an associate professorship focusing on justice and policy studies at UOIT (now referred to as Ontario Tech University). Shortly after her promotion to full professor, she was named 2007 Critical Criminologist of the Year by the American Society of Criminology (ASC) for her book Advancing Critical Criminology.

In 2018, Perry founded the Centre on Hate, Bias and Extremism (CHBE) at Ontario Tech University to "advance awareness, understanding and prevention of hate, bias and extremism." She received an international research chairship in 2020 as the United Nations Educational, Scientific and Cultural Organization Chair in Hate Studies. Perry was also recognized as the 2020 ASC's Division of Terrorism and Bias Crime Distinguished Scholar. In 2024, Perry was appointed a Member of the Order of Canada for advancing the field of hate crime in academia, raising public awareness, and supporting victims of violence and extremism.

== Selected publications ==
The following is a list of selected publications:

- In The Name of Hate (2001)
- Advancing Critical Criminology (2007)
- Silent Victims: Hate Crimes Against Native Americans (2008)
- Hate and Bias Crime: A Reader (2012)
- Right-Wing Extremism in Canada (2019).
- ——; Gruenewald, Jeff; Scrivens, Ryan, eds. (2022). Right-Wing Extremism in Canada and the United States. Cham: Palgrave Macmillan. ISBN 978-3-030-99804-2.
