= Critical Legal Conference =

The Critical Legal Conference (CLC) is an annual critical legal theory conference which gathers a community of critical legal theoreticians and activists. Along with the Conference on Critical Legal Studies in America, and Critique du Droit in France it contributed to the formation of critical legal theory as a movement and field. The conference is based in the UK but it has also been held in India, Finland and Ireland. It is associated with the critical legal studies (CLS) movement and loosely associated with the journal Law & Critique.

Despite the putative association with American CLS, Costas Douzinas, who has been closely involved with the British CLC from its outset, has argued that their ethos are very different. American CLS was intellectually focused on the "critique of the judicial institutions and reasoning" while its politics "were largely exhausted in the intrigue of the academy and the endless search for media exposure". If, on the one hand, American CLS was a "political movement with little politics",

[t]he British Critical Legal Conference (CLC), on the other hand, is an intellectual movement with lots of politics. The annual CLC started in 1984 and has taken place without interruption ever since. In all these years of operation no officers or posts, chairmen and secretaries, committees or delegates were created. There is no organization. The conference was and remains just that: a conference and an umbrella name. We could call the CLC ‘a community always to come’, a broad church that exists for three days once every year in its gathering and ceases existing once it is over. Every September the place for the next conference is decided and people bid their good-byes for another year, leaving it to the next organiser to put together the programme. No honour, power or position attaches to the conference, no promotion preferment or move to better posts follows organisation or participation. There is only an annual conference and people who turn out every year because they love ideas and they are concerned about the role of law in society and their own role within the institution. Over the years, these conferences introduced themes, schools of thought and movements unknown or dismissed by legal scholarship. Western Marxism, postmodernism and deconstruction were the main theoretical influences of the early conferences but soon the new radicalism of race, gender, queer and post-colonial theory were introduced in the legal academy through the CLC. Indeed these conferences were the only academic venues in which such themes were discussed for many years before they became respectable and entered, albeit marginally, mainstream academia.

The Critical Legal Conference was established in 1984 and its first annual meeting was held at the University of Kent in 1986. Alan Hunt was the founding chair of the Critical Legal Conference.

== See also ==
- Philosophy of law
