= Louis Michael Seidman =

American legal philosopher (born 1947)

- Born: 1947 (age 78–79)

Philosophical work
- School: Critical Theory
- Main interests: Legal philosophy
- Notable ideas: Critical Legal Studies, theory of constitutional unsettlement

Louis Michael Seidman (born 1947) is the Carmack Waterhouse Professor of Constitutional Law at Georgetown University Law Center in Washington, D.C. He is a constitutional law scholar and major proponent of the critical legal studies movement. Seidman's work includes the 2012 book On Constitutional Disobedience, where he challenges the viability of political policy arguments made in reference to constitutional obligation.

== Education and early career ==
Seidman received a Bachelor of Arts from University of Chicago and a Juris Doctor from Harvard Law School in 1971. After graduation, he clerked for Judge Skelly Wright of the D.C. Circuit and later clerked for Justice Thurgood Marshall of the United States Supreme Court. Following his clerkship, Seidman joined the Public Defender Service for the District of Columbia.

== Academic work and influence ==
Seidman is known for his contributions to constitutional legal theory, principally his theory of unsettlement put forward in his book Our Unsettled Constitution: A New Defense of Constitutionalism and Judicial Review (Yale 2001). Drawing from the critical legal studies indeterminacy thesis, Seidman argues that because constitutional law cannot settle fundamental political disputes, constitutional legal discourse and judicial review instead act to "unsettle" them. Rather than resolving conflicts definitively, the temporary resolution of any controversy in constitutional law through judicial review leaves open the possibility that the losing side may make an equally plausible alternative constitutional argument. In this way, both the prevailing and losing sides in a dispute recognize their positions as unstable and subject to revision within the recognized standards of legal argument. As a result, both winners and losers have reasons to continue their debate within the framework of constitutional law, thereby keeping all parties at the table and consolidating the legal system.

Seidman's defense of judicial review provided a counterpoint within the critical legal studies school to his colleague and sometime collaborator Mark Tushnet's attack on judicial review as undemocratic.

In addition to Seidman's theory of judicial review, he is also known for his constitutional law casebook co-authored with Pamela Karlan, Tushnet, Geoffrey Stone, and Cass Sunstein. Seidman is also noted for his work in criminal law and his book Silence and Freedom.

In 2009, Seidman was interviewed for Fora.tv (a video production and distribution company) about healthcare policy in the United States, defending the constitutionality of the individual mandate of the Affordable Care Act against right-wing and pro-corporate criticism.

== Selected bibliography ==
- Louis Michael Seidman, On Constitutional Disobedience (Oxford University Press, 2012)
- Louis Michael Seidman, Depoliticizing Federalism 35 Harv. J. L. & Pub. Pol'y 121 (2012)
- Louis Michael Seidman, Hyper-Incarceration and Strategies of Disruption: Is There a Way Out? 9 Ohio St. J. Crim. L. 109 (2011)
- Louis Michael Seidman, Our Unsettled Ninth Amendment: An Essay on Unenumerated Rights and the Impossibility of Textualism, 98 Cal. L. Rev. 2129 (2010)
- Louis Michael Seidman, Should we Have a Liberal Constitution? 27 Const. Comment. 541 (2010)
- Louis Michael Seidman, Mark V. Tushnet, Geoffrey R. Stone, Cass R. Sunstein & Pamela S. Karlan, Constitutional Law (New York: Aspen Publishers 6th ed. 2009).
- Louis Michael Seidman, Silence and Freedom (Stanford, CA: Stanford University Press 2007).
- Louis Michael Seidman, Constitutional Law: Equal Protection of the Laws (New York: Foundation Press 2003).
- Louis Michael Seidman, Our Unsettled Constitution: A New Defense of Constitutionalism and Judicial Review (New Haven, Conn.: Yale University Press 2001).
- Louis Michael Seidman, Can Constitutionalism be Leftist?, 26 Quinnipiac L. Rev. 557–577 (2008).
- Louis Michael Seidman, Gay Sex and Marriage, the Reciprocal Disadvantage Problem, and the Crisis in Liberal Constitutional Theory, 31 Harv. J.L. & Pub. Pol'y 135–150 (2008).
- Louis Michael Seidman, Critical Constitutionalism Now, 75 Fordham L. Rev. 575–592 (2006)
- Louis Michael Seidman, Left Out, 67 Law & Contemp. Probs. 23–32 (2004).
- Louis Michael Seidman, The Secret Life of the Political Question Doctrine, 37 J. Marshall L. Rev. 441–480 (2004).
- Louis Michael Seidman & Mark V. Tushnet, When Judges Tell Us What They Mean, 5 Graven Images 254–258 (2002).
- Louis Michael Seidman, What's So Bad About Bush v. Gore? An Essay on Our Unsettled Election, 47 Wayne L. Rev. 953–1026 (2001).
- Louis Michael Seidman, "What are You Doing Here?" An Autobiographical Fragment, in Law Touched Our Hearts: A Generation Remembers Brown v. Board of Education 166–168 (Mildred Wigfall Robinson & Richard J. Bonnie eds., Nashville, TN: Vanderbilt University Press 2008).
- Louis Michael Seidman, Comment: Marbury and the Authoritarian Straddle, in Arguing Marbury v. Madison 160–165 (Mark V. Tushnet ed., Stanford, CA: Stanford Law and Politics 2005).
- Louis Michael Seidman, Judicial Activism and Judicial Restraint, Entry, in 3 Encyclopedia of the American Constitution 1449–1450 (Leonard W. Levy, Kenneth L. Karst & Dennis J. Mahoney eds., New York: MacMillan Reference 2d ed. 2000).

== See also ==
- Critical legal studies
- Indeterminacy debate in legal theory
- List of law clerks for the tenth seat of the Supreme Court of the United States
