= Centre on Human Rights in Conflict =

- Formation: 2006
- Founder: Chandra Lekha Sriram
- Type: Research centre
- Headquarters: London, United Kingdom
- Coordinates: 51°30′28.69″N 0°3′49.93″E
- Director: John Strawson
- Parent organization: University of East London School of Law

The Centre on Human Rights in Conflict (CHRC) is a research centre based within the University of East London School of Law directed by John Strawson. The Centre was founded in 2006 by Professor Chandra Lekha Sriram. The Centre on Human Rights in Conflict (CHRC) is an interdisciplinary centre promoting policy-relevant research and events aimed at developing greater knowledge about the relationship between human rights and conflict.

The international nature of the research undertaken by the CHRC is evident in its research collaborators which include, as part of a European Union Framework VII-funded project on building "A just and durable peace by piece," led by the University of Lund, Sweden: the Regional Centre on Conflict Prevention, Jordan; Uppsala University, Sweden; the University of Bath, the University of St. Andrews, and the Swiss Centre for Conflict Research, Hebrew University of Jerusalem.

In 2009 the Centre publish a textbook entitled War, conflict, and human rights: Theory and practice, and an edited volume entitled Surviving field research: Working in violent and difficult situations (with colleagues at American University in Washington DC). In 2010, the Centre published an edited volume entitled Peacebuilding and the rule of law in Africa: Just peace?

In addition to European Union grant, the CHRC and its researchers have been awarded grants from the: Social Science Research Council/MacArthur Foundation (United States), the Social Sciences and Humanities Research Council of Canada; the Nuffield Foundation, the British Academy, the Leverhulme Trust, the Carnegie Trust for the Universities of Scotland, and UEL's Promising Researcher Scheme.
