= Jean Stefancic =

American legal academic, professor and critical race theorist

Jean Stefancic is an American legal academic, Professor and Clement Research Affiliate at the University of Alabama. She has written numerous books with her husband Richard Delgado.

== Life ==
Stefancic received a BA from Maryville College and an MA from the University of San Francisco. She taught at the University of Pittsburgh for five years, during which she was a research professor of law and a Derrick Bell scholar. She spent ten years at the University of Colorado law school. There she was on the advisory committee of the Center of the American West and affiliated with the Latino/a Research & Policy Center. She became a research professor of law at Seattle University law school, before moving to the University of Alabama in 2013.

== Works ==
- (with Richard Delgado) Failed revolutions: social reform and the limits of legal imagination. Boulder, Colo.: Westview Press, 1994.
- (with Richard Delgado) No mercy: how conservative think tanks and foundations changed America's social agenda. Philadelphia: Temple University Press, 1996. Foreword by Mark Tushnet.
- (ed. with Richard Delgado) Critical white studies: looking behind the mirror. Philadelphia: Temple University Press, 1997.
- (with Richard Delgado) Must we defend Nazis? : hate speech, pornography, and the new First Amendment. New York: New York University Press, 1997.
- (ed. with Richard Delgado) The Latino/a condition: a critical reader. New York : New York University Press, 1998.
- (with Richard Delgado) Critical race theory: an introduction. New York: New York University, 2001. Foreword by Angela Harris.
- (with Richard Delgado) Understanding words that wound. Boulder, Colo.: Westview Press, 2004.
- (with Richard Delgado) How lawyers lose their way: a profession fails its creative minds. Durham: Duke University Press, 2004.
- (ed. with Richard Delgado) The Derrick Bell reader. New York: New York University Press, 2005.
- (ed. with Adrien Katherine Wing) The law unbound! A Richard Delgado reader. Boulder: Paradigm Publishers, 2007.
- ' Terrace v. Thompson and the Legacy of Manifest Destiny', 12 Nev. L.J. 532 (2012).
