= Mark Kelman =

American lawyer

Mark Kelman (born August 20, 1951) is jurist and vice dean of Stanford Law School. As a prominent legal scholar, he has applied social science methodologies, including economics and psychology, to the study of law. He is one of the most cited law professors. He is regarded as one of the co-founders of the critical legal studies movement and authored "A Guide to Critical Legal Studies." He is widely known for his influential 1978 critique of the Coase theorem, a core part of law and economics.

He graduated from Harvard College and Harvard Law School.

== Narrative ==
Being a published novelist, Kelman is well aware of the role of narrative in forming a sense of personal identity - as also of the way narratives may be incriminating or exculpatory, depending on the time frame used.

Thus, for example, when viewed in a long enough time-frame, a criminal act which appears at first sight the result of individual responsibility may, Kelman suggests, be instead the deterministic result of socio-economic conditions.

== Rational rhetoricism ==
Kelman argues that much in the law involves providing rational interpretative constructs that surround a non-rational core – what he terms 'rational rhetoricism' with the result that, in his words, "It is illuminating and disquieting to see that we are nonrationally constructing the legal world over and over again....".

Stanley Fish has proposed in rebuttal that such rhetorical constructs are in fact a necessary aspect of the human condition, and thus an inevitable facet of the legal world as well.

== See also ==
- Negative capability
- Roberto Unger

== Publications ==
- Mark Kelman, What Followed Was Pure Lesley (1973)
- Mark Kelman, 'Choice & Utility' Wisconsin Law Review 1979 (1979)
- Mark Kelman, 'Interpretive Construction in the Substantive Criminal Law' Stanford Law Review (1981)
