= Employment discrimination law in the European Union =

Employment discrimination law in the European Union comprises two directives. The directives were agreed by all EU member states in 2000. Each member state was then obliged to incorporate these new laws into their national legislation. The European Parliament Committee on Employment and Social Affairs is responsible for oversight.

== Background ==
The Article 13 of the Treaty of Amsterdam, entered into force in 1999, granted the European Union some powers to combat discrimination on the basis of:

- Race or ethnic origin,
- Sex, Pregnancy
- Sexual orientation
- Religion or belief
- Disability (physical or mental, including HIV status)
- Age

According to the European Court of Justice:

(...) discrimination can arise only through the application of different rules to comparable situations or the application of the same rule to different situations.

== Employment Equality Framework Directive (2000/78) ==
The Employment Equality Framework Directive establishes a general framework for equal treatment in employment and occupation. It aims to protects everyone in the EU from discrimination based on age, disability, sexual orientation and religion or belief in the workplace.

== Racial Equality Directive (2000/43) ==
The Racial Equality Directive prohibits discrimination on the grounds of racial or ethnic origin in the workplace as well as in other areas of life such as education, social security, healthcare and access to goods and services.

== Limits of anti-discrimination legislation ==
In Germany, universities are generally not required to advertise most vacancies of academic positions (teaching and/or research) other than tenured full professors (verbeamtete Hochschullehrer). At the same time, Germany has made sure that European Union laws on anti-discrimination measures and equal opportunities only apply to advertised jobs and to the wording of the job advert. Universities can therefore effectively avoid to implement any anti-discrimination measures by not advertising jobs.

== See also ==
- Equality Act 2010
- European labour law
- List of European Union directives
- UK labour law
