= Karl Klare =

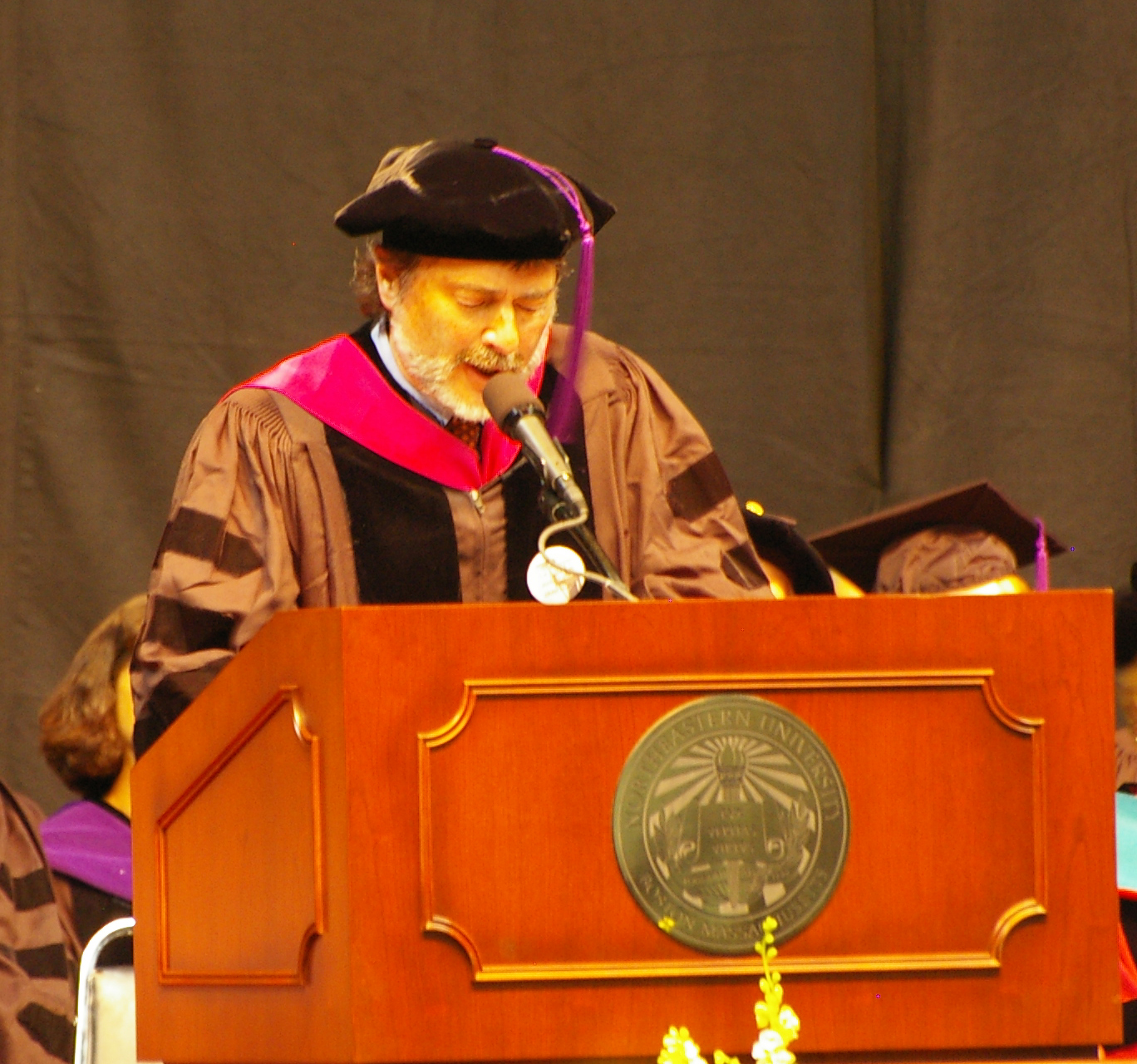
Professor Karl E. Klare, speaking at the Northeastern University School of Law graduation for the class of 2008.

Karl E. Klare is a Matthews Distinguished University Professor of labor and employment law and legal theory at Northeastern University School of Law in Boston, Massachusetts, and the current coordinator of the International Network on Transformative Employment and Labor Law (INTELL). He has written and lectured extensively on labor and employment issues, and is a notable proponent of the critical legal studies movement.

Karl Klare graduated from Columbia University in 1967 with a Bachelor of Arts, and received his master's degree the following year from Yale University. During this time, Klare was an avid participant in the 1960s civil rights, antiwar and student movements. As the 60s came to a close, Klare attended Harvard Law School and graduated with his Juris Doctor in the spring of 1975. Since that time, he has been a visiting professor at the University of British Columbia, University of Michigan, and the University of Toronto, and has held a senior Fulbright chair at the European University Institute in Florence, Italy. In 1993, Professor Klare was named a George J. and Kathleen Waters Matthews Distinguished University Professor, Northeastern University's highest honor. In recent years, Professor Klare's activism and writing have focused primarily on workplace issues and human rights, taking him as far as South Africa, where he has worked on numerous projects with local lawyers.

== Selected publications ==
- "Law-Making as Praxis". Telos 40 (Summer 1979). New York: Telos Press.
