= Alan Hunt (academic) =

Canadian sociologist

- Born: February 2, 1942; London, United Kingdom
- Died: December 8, 2021 (aged 79); Ottawa, Canada
- Cause of death: Assisted suicide
- Occupation: Academic
- Years active: 1975–2020
- Board member of: Marxism Today
- Spouse(s): Judith Hunt; Rosalind Allchin (1979–2021)

Academic background
- Education: University of Leeds
- Thesis: The Sociological Movement in Law: Sociological Jurisprudence and the Sociology of Law (1974)
- Influences: Evgeny Pashukanis; E.P. Thompson; Antonio Gramsci

Academic work
- Institutions: Middlesex University (1975–1988); Carleton University (1988–)
- Notable students: Costas Douzinas; Barbara Perry

Alan John Hunt (1942–2021) was a British-Canadian legal theorist and sociologist.

== Biography ==
Hunt, the son of a Barclays Bank accountant, was born in London during the Blitz and spent a part of World War II with his parents in the countryside. He abandoned his parents' Christian Scientist faith by the age of ten. He joined Bertrand Russell's Campaign for Nuclear Disarmament in his teens and was recruited by the Communist Party of Great Britain in the early 1960s.

Hunt studied sociology and law, earning a BA and an LLB from the University of Leeds. He served as a secretary of the National Union of Students and was active in the Radical Students Alliance, formed in 1966, alongside Martin Jacques and Jack Straw. In 1970, he was with the Manchester Metropolitan University. He then completed a PhD thesis in law on The Sociological Movement in Law: Sociological Jurisprudence and the Sociology of Law at Leeds in 1974.

In 1975, he joined Middlesex University, where he held the positions of Reader in Law, Head of School and Assistant Dean. He organized CPGB's summer Communist University of London in 1976 and was the secretary of CPGB's Sociology Study Group during the late 1970s. He also sat on the editorial board of Marxism Today (to which he contributed until 1985) and convinced Stuart Hall, who was not a party member, to join the board. He was the founding chair of the Critical Legal Conference at the University of Kent in 1985.

He moved to Carleton University in Ottawa, Canada, as a visiting scholar in law, sociology and anthropology in 1988, and was appointed full professor in 1989. He held the chair of Chancellor's Professor of Sociology and Law at Carleton. From 1995 to 2020, he ran a social theory reading group at his home, attended by fellow academics, graduate students, and civil servants.

Afflicted by an illness, he chose a medically-assisted death in 2021.

His main fields of research interests included legal theory, sociology of law, the relationship between legal and social theory, social regulation and the way in which law interacts with other forms of control, with a particular interest in the regulation of consumption (e.g. alcohol, tobacco, etc.). He researched the relationship between moral and legal regulation with particular reference to the control of sexuality, prostitution and pornography.

== Books ==
=== Authored ===
- The Sociological Movement in Law, Macmillan Press, London 1978.
- Explorations in Law and Society: Towards a Constitutive Theory of Law, New York: Routledge, 1993.
- Foucault and Law: Towards a New Sociology of Law as Governance (with Gary Wickham), Boulder, Co.: Westview Press, 1994.
- Governance of the Consuming Passions: A History of Sumptuary Regulation, London: Macmillan, 1996.
- Governing Morals: A Social History of Moral Regulation, Cambridge: Cambridge University Press, 1999.

=== Edited ===
- Class and Class Structure, London: Lawrence & Wishart, 1977.
- Marx and Engels on Law (with Maureen Cain), London: Academic Press, 1979.
- Marxism and Democracy, London: Lawrence & Wishart, 1980.
- Critical Legal Studies (with Peter Fitzpatrick), Oxford: Blackwell, 1987.
- Reading Dworkin Critically, New York: Berg, 1992.
- Emotions Matter: A Relational Approach to Emotions (with Dale C. Spencer and Kevin Walby), Toronto: University of Toronto Press, 2018.
