= Gabriella Gutiérrez y Muhs =

American professor

- Awards: The Calabash Award, 2000, California. The Inaugural Provost's Award for Scholarship, Research and Creativity, 2015, Seattle University

Academic background
- Education: Occidental College; University of California, Santa Cruz; Colegio de México; Stanford University

Academic work
- Main interests: Chicana and Latin American literature, cultural studies, and feminist theory.
- Notable works: Presumed Incompetent, Word Images, Rebozos de Palabras, Communal Feminisms, A Most Improbable Life, The Runaway Poems

Gabriella Gutiérrez y Muhs is a full professor of Modern Languages and Cultures, and Women, Gender, and Sexuality Studies at the Seattle University. She is the current Theiline Pigott-McCone Chair (2018-2020) at Seattle University. She was a commissioner for the Washington State Arts Commission from 2014 to 2017.

== Early life and education ==
In a 2013 interview, Gutiérrez y Muhs mentioned that she grew up in Mexico and was named after the Chilean poet Gabriela Mistral. Gutiérrez y Muhs received her Ph.D. from Stanford University in 2000 in Spanish, Latin American Studies, and U.S. Latinx/Chicanx. She is a well-known scholar in the fields of Chicana and Latin American literature, cultural studies, and feminist theory. Gutiérrez y Muhs received two B.A.s from Occidental College, in Spanish and French, as well as two minors in Anthropology and Sociology and a Latin American Studies minor. She received a teaching credential from UCSC, K-12, clear, bilingual, and holds Administrative Credentials. She worked as Director of Women's Crisis Support and Shelter Services, South County Commission on Alcoholism, Youth Services and as a High School Counselor art Watsonville High School. She also taught French at WHS. Dr. Gutiérrez y Muhs speaks five languages fluently: Spanish, English, French, Italian, and Portuguese. She has taught and presented internationally in Spanish, English and French. She received a graduate studies scholarship from Rotary International to study theatre in Spain, 1984–1985, and also worked with Teatro Campesino's winter productions in the 1980s.

== Career ==
After being tenured in March 2006, Gutiérrez y Muhs was named the 2007-2009 Wismer Professor for Gender and Diversity Studies at Seattle University. She was appointed as the Theiline Pigott-McCone Chair at the university for the period 2018–2020. In 2011, she represented the United States at the Kritya International Poetry Festival held in Nagpur, India, along with two other American poets.

She gained attention for her work as First Editor of the 2012 book Presumed Incompetent: The Intersections of Race and Class for Women in Academia which discussed the experiences of various women of color in academia and later for her 2013 book Rebozos de Palabras: an Helena Maria Viramontes critical reader, on the contributions of Helena Maria Viramontes. Gutiérrez y Muhs is also a renowned poet whose work has been published in numerous journals and collections in the U.S., France, Spain, and Chile.

== Selected bibliography ==
=== Books ===
- Muhs, Gabriella Gutiérrez y (2002). A most improbable life: poems. Georgetown, Kentucky: Finishing Line Press. ISBN 9780972613668.
- Muhs, Gabriella Gutiérrez y (2010). Communal feminisms: Chicanas, Chilenas, and cultural exile: theorizing the space of exile, class, and identity. Lanham, Maryland: Lexington Books. ISBN 9780739144596.
- Muhs, Gabriella Gutiérrez y; Harris, Angela P.; Flores Niemann, Yolanda; González, Carmen G. (2012). Presumed incompetent: the intersections of race and class for women in academia. Boulder, Colorado: University Press of Colorado. ISBN 9780874219227.
- Muhs, Gabriella Gutiérrez y (2013). Rebozos de palabras: an Helena María Viramontes critical reader. Tucson: University of Arizona Press. ISBN 9780816521364.
- Muhs, Gabriella Gutiérrez y (2017). Word Images New Perspectives on Canícula and Other Works by Norma Elia Cantú. University of Arizona Press. ISBN 9780816534098.
