= Voluntary action =

Conscious action implemented act free will

Voluntary action is an anticipated goal-oriented movement. The concept of voluntary action arises in many areas of study, including cognitive psychology, operant conditioning, philosophy, neurology, criminology, and others. Additionally, voluntary action has various meanings depending on the context in which it is used. For example, operant psychology uses the term to refer to the actions that are modifiable by their consequences. A more cognitive account may refer to voluntary action as involving the identification of a desired outcome together with the action necessary to achieve that outcome. Voluntary action is often associated with consciousness and will. For example, Psychologist Charles Nuckolls holds that we control our voluntary behavior, and that it is not known how we come to plan what actions will be executed. Many psychologists, notably Tolman, apply the concept of voluntary action to both animal and human behavior, raising the issue of animal consciousness and its role in voluntary action.

== History: William James on voluntary action ==
The concept of voluntary action was discussed by William James in his influential book The Principles of Psychology (1890). James states that for an act to be classified as voluntary, it must be foreseen, as opposed to involuntary action which occurs without foresight. James suggests, for example, that the idea of a particular movement is a voluntary action; however, the movement itself, once the idea has been formed, is involuntary, provided the action itself requires no further thought. Voluntary action arises because humans and animals wish to fulfill desires. In order to fulfill these desires, humans and animals form goals and voluntary actions are undertaken to achieve these goals. Some of the terms that James used to describe voluntary action – such as desire – are now outdated, and his introspective approach is out of favor, but many of his ideas are still find a place in current thinking.

== See also ==
- Involuntary action
- Cognitive psychology
- William James
- The Principles of Psychology
