= Ascriptive inequality =

Ascription occurs when social class or stratum placement is primarily hereditary. In other words, people are placed in positions in a stratification system because of qualities beyond their control. Race, sex, age, class at birth, religion, ethnicity, species, and residence are all good examples of these qualities. Ascription is one way sociologists explain why stratification occurs.

== History ==
=== Ralph Linton ===
This idea was first introduced into Sociology by anthropologist Ralph Linton in 1936 when he described it in his work The Study of Man . His coined terms of role and ascribed status and achieved status are the three terms that gained him the most sociological acceptance. Although role has become bothersome, “ascription and achievement have such strong face validity that they are rarely challenged or examined”.

According to Linton, the conventional view of ascription provides three different explanations for the practice of ascription: (1) It facilitates socialization for positions in the division of labor. (2) it is inevitable, given the usual cohesion of the relationship unit and its communication with the occupational system. (3) It prevails and persists because it is an efficient and inexpensive way to solve certain problems of “functional subsystems” in society. Linton viewed ascription of status as a means by which society could begin to prepare the individual from birth for his or her future functions on the assumption that the earlier training for a class can begin, the more successful it is likely to be. He also proposed that in all societies the actual ascription of statuses to the individual is controlled by a series of reference points. Together, these reference points serve to restrict the domain of his future participation in the life of the group. These points of reference include age, sex, family relationships, and caste or class.

=== Kingsley Davis ===
In 1950 sociologist Kingsley Davis proposed that status is ascribed to an infant as a consequence of the position of the socializing agents (usually the parents). Because of such subjective connection of the infant with people who already have a status in the social structure, it immediately gives the child membership in the society and a specific place in the system of social status. Statuses of the agent that can define the infant include kinship, race, citizenship, religious affiliation, community membership, and legitimacy. However, age and sex are two of the most prominent criteria of ascription and they are applicable to the child without being based on the statues of the socializing agent. Therefore, one ascriptive reference point can originate from the inherent characteristics of the child regardless of the socializing agent while the other can originate from the agent's status.

Davis also thought that it was important to note that ascribed statues limit the achievement of achieved statuses meaning that a person may not be exposed to the tools necessary to achieve their full potential simply because of their ascribed status. Davis believed that ascriptive inequality led to stratification; however, he also believed that stratification was a functioning mechanism to motivate people to do better. He thought that there were certain individuals who were designed for a task, but that others could use competition as motivation to move up the social hierarchy based on their achievements. Ascription is a barrier to this Social Mobility. Although the training for a person's ascribed status begins theoretically from birth, it is much more than simply training for a person's occupation. It is training for a life of justifiable status, whether it be greater or lesser, and hence perpetuates ascriptive inequality; inequality based on non-performance grounds.

=== Talcott Parsons ===
Talcott Parsons said in 1951 that ascription defined patterns of differential treatment within a role. He concluded that points of ascription are either primary or secondary and then can further be broken down into classificatory or relational aspects. An example of primary-classificatory organization would be sex and then race. An example of primary-relational organization would be age and kinship. Kinship is the social class position is ascriptively determined for the child by the link between the father's family role and his work role. Parsons also claims that “ascription is a crucial point of convergence and marks the intergenerational transformation of power into status”.

== Why does ascriptive inequality occur? ==
Sociologist Barbara Reskin has done extensive research to try to explain why and how ascriptive inequality occurs. Most commonly, it is thought to occur because of a person's motives, such as personal taste for example. When examining ascriptive inequality using the conflict theory, it appears as though dominant groups use their control over resources to uphold their privileges and therefore exemplify motive-based explanations. "Theories that attempt to explain why inequality occurs often say it is the result of separate individuals acting to advance their own interests".

Because employers "tastes" can explain why they are willing to pay higher wages to one group as opposed to another, many acts of discrimination that lead to inequality occur frequently. For example, until the 1980s only males held managerial positions and most often they were white. When asked why this was, many responded saying that they preferred "ease of communication and hence social certainty over the strains of dealing with persons who are 'different'". This is conflict theory in action. When minority groups become large enough to threaten whites, whites respond by demoting minorities to worse jobs and thus perpetuate the problems of ascriptive inequality because these men are simply being judged by their race and not by their performance.

However, it is hard to actually prove why ascriptive inequality occurs because motive based theories cannot be empirically tested because people's motives cannot be observed. Motive based theories attribute these motives as across-the-board explanations to all members of an ascriptive group, and thus excludes analyses that take advantage of the explanatory power of deviation among allocators.

== How does ascriptive inequality happen? ==
Ascriptive inequality is acted out through mechanisms. Mechanisms are an account of what brings about change in some variable. The four types of mechanisms responsible for ascriptive inequality are intrapsychic, interpersonal, societal, and organizational. Intrapsychic mechanisms uses psychological theories such as social cognition and self-fulfilling to generate ascriptive inequality because these theories use the stereotypes of minorities to justify that they deserve unequal compensation. Interpersonal mechanisms use the interactions between members of different ascriptive groups to determine the result. Often, the minority groups gets worse treatment as the majority member may be more rude to the minority member in an interview for example. Social mechanisms are social measures that link ascriptive group membership to opportunities and rewards. Because people associate certain stereotypes with members of an ascriptive group, such as race, in groups and out groups are formed. Members of a minority group, or out group, are particularly visible to a majority group, and because society has already shaped the majority's perception and distorted it, it leads them to behave in ways that disadvantage minority group members. For example, Title 7 and its amendments bar employment discrimination based on race, national origin, religion, sex, pregnancy, age, and disability and it therefore indirectly affects ascriptive inequality because it impacts what employers do. Lastly, organizational mechanisms can cause various levels of ascriptive inequality by requiring, permitting, or preventing differential treatment through organizational practices such as dress codes.

== Conclusion ==
Although ascriptive inequality may not be obvious at first, a closer examination of our society will reveal that inequalities are all around us. Every day women go to work and on average earn 40 cents less than men because of their sex. [NOTE: This statistic (as well as the more often quoted 22%) is nonsense, as anyone familiar with female wage disparities knows.] Working-class students may be denied the chance to go to college because they grew up in a school system that did not have the resources to adequately prepare them. An African American man may not be able to buy a house in a white neighborhood because a realtor is afraid his family will make the property value go down. These inequalities are more common than they should be and are based on factors that people have been dealing with from birth and may not be able to change. New laws and government regulations have helped combat some of these issues but our society is nowhere as equal as it could be.

== See also ==
- Social stratification
- Equal pay for women
- Social Mobility
