= School of Law and Social Sciences, University of East London =

School at the University of East London

University of East London, School of Law and Social Sciences
- Type: Law and Social Sciences School
- Chancellor: Amanda Broderick
- Students: 1,000+
- Location: London, United Kingdom; 51°30′28.69″N 0°3′49.93″E
- Campus: Urban
- Colours: Pantone 2945; Pantone 2925
- Website: http://www.uel.ac.uk/law

The School of Law and Social Sciences is one of eight academic schools at the University of East London in East London, England. The School teaches six undergraduate courses, ten postgraduate courses, and houses the Centre on Human Rights in Conflict. The School is attended by over 1,000 students.' The majority of the School's courses are taught at the University of East London's Duncan House, near to its Stratford Campus, however the Law School's Refugee Studies course is based at the University of East London's Docklands Campus. Based on the 2008 Research Assessment Exercise, The Times Higher Education survey ranked the school 38th in the UK.

== Teaching ==
=== Undergraduate ===
The School offers several undergraduate courses, consisting of: Law LLB (Hons), Criminology and Criminal Justice BA (Hons) and Applied Criminology FdA (Foundation Degree).

Some of these courses are also offered using distance learning methods.

=== Postgraduate ===
The School offers several specializations such as International Law (LLM), Human Rights (LLM), Criminal Justice, World Economy, Financial Markets, Islamic and Middle Eastern Studies as well as General Law (LLM). In addition, the School offers graduate degrees in Terrorism Studies (MSc) and Refugee Studies (MA).

=== Partnerships ===
The School of Law has a partnership with International Correspondence Schools (ICS) to deliver three courses by distance learning. These courses are in BA (Hons) in Psychology Studies and Criminology, BA (Hons) in Criminology and Criminal Justice and the LLB (Hons) in Law.

== Research ==
The Centre on Human Rights in Conflict (CHRC) is a research centre based within the UEL School of Law which was founded in 2006 by Professor Chandra Lekha Sriram.

The international research undertaken by the CHRC is evidenced by its collaborations with, the universities of Lund and Uppsala, Sweden; the Regional Centre on Conflict Prevention, Jordan; and the Hebrew University of Jerusalem among others.

The researchers at the CHRC have been awarded grants from the European Union, the British Academy, the Leverhulme Trust, and UEL's Promising Researcher Scheme.

== Notable people ==
=== Notable alumni ===
- Mark Stephens — media lawyer and human rights activist
- Imran Khan - human rights lawyer and solicitor to the family of Stephen Lawrence

=== Notable faculty ===
- Fiona Fairweather — Dean of the School of Law at the University of East London from 1999 until 2011, Dean of the School of Law and Social Sciences from 2011 until 2014; writer and lecturer on the subjects of police powers and suspects' rights
