= Indeterminacy debate in legal theory =

The indeterminacy debate in legal theory can be summed up as follows: Can the law constrain the results reached by adjudicators in legal disputes? Some members of the critical legal studies movement — primarily legal academics in the United States — argued that the answer to this question is "no." Another way to state this position is to suggest that disputes cannot be resolved with clear answers, and therefore at least some amount of uncertainty is unavoidable in legal reasoning and its application to disputes. A given body of legal doctrine is shown to be indeterminate by demonstrating that every legal rule in that body of legal doctrine is opposed by a counterrule that can be used in a process of legal reasoning.

The indeterminacy thesis emerged as a reply to Ronald Dworkin's "right answer" thesis, which claims that, in theory, every question of legal interpretation has a right answer. In its strongest form it is an extreme version of legal realism. It argues that nothing is law until it has been promulgated by an official — either a judge or the legislature. For example, a statute that states, "No person may smoke in a hospital" does not mean that "John Doe may not smoke in a hospital"; the second statement is the law only if a legitimate authority declares it so.

This is because one cannot describe a legal statement as right or wrong without making a normative value judgment about what the law should be.

In the 1990s the indeterminacy thesis came under heavy attack by liberal and conservative defenders of the rule of law, and the debate, though its mantle is in the process of being taken up by a new generation of scholars, has left the intellectual spotlight for the time being.

The thesis can be criticised because the concept of legal mistake is recognised in a determinative theory of law. While such a mistake necessarily involves a normative judgment, it is not truly subjective. A positivist theory, such as H. L. A. Hart's, contends that this judgment is conventionally objective, because the rule of recognition fails to recognise the mistake as legally valid. According to a liberal theory such as Dworkin's, the normativity of the judgment is one of reason rather than of value.

== See also ==
- Judicial activism
- Philosophy of law

== Bibliography ==
- Ronald Dworkin, "No Right Answer?", Law, Morality, and Society (P. M. S. Hacker and Joseph Raz, eds., Oxford: Clarendon Press, 1977).
- Lawrence Solum, "On the Indeterminacy Crisis: Critiquing Critical Dogma", 54 The University of Chicago Law Review 462 (1987).
- Kenneth J. Kress, "Legal Indeterminacy", 77 California Law Review 283 (1989).
- Mark Tushnet, "Critical Legal Theory (without Modifiers) in the United States", 13(1) Journal of Political Philosophy 99 (2005).
- A.D. Woozley, "No Right Answer", Ronald Dworkin and Contemporary Jurisprudence (Marshall Cohen, ed., London: Duckworth, 1984).
- Quentin du Plessis, "Sources of Legal Indeterminacy", 138 South African Law Journal 115 (2021).
