= Martha Albertson Fineman =

American legal scholar

- Born: 1943 (age 82–83)

Philosophical work
- Era: 20th-century philosophy
- Region: Western philosophy
- School: Continental philosophy, critical legal theory, feminist legal theory
- Institutions: Emory University School of Law (2004–); Cornell Law School (1999–2004); Columbia Law School (1990–1999); University of Wisconsin Law School (1976–1990)
- Main interests: Jurisprudence, political philosophy, family law
- Notable ideas: Legal implications of vulnerability, Vulnerability Theory

Martha Albertson Fineman (born 1943) is an American jurist, legal theorist and political philosopher. She is Robert W. Woodruff Professor of Law at Emory University School of Law. Fineman was previously the first holder of the Dorothea S. Clarke Professor of Feminist Jurisprudence at Cornell Law School. She held the Maurice T. Moore Professorship at Columbia Law School.

Fineman works in the areas of feminist legal theory and critical legal theory and directs the Feminism and Legal Theory Project, which she founded in 1984. Much of her early scholarship focuses on the legal regulation of family and intimacy, and she has been called "the preeminent feminist family theorist of our time." She has since broadened her scope to focus on the legal implications of universal dependency, vulnerability and justice. Her recent work formulates a theory of vulnerability. She is a progressive liberal thinker; she has been an affiliated scholar of John Podesta's Center for American Progress.

== Career ==
Fineman has a B.A. from Temple University (1971) and a J.D. from the University of Chicago (1975). After graduating from law school, she clerked for the Hon. Luther Merritt Swygert of the U.S. Court of Appeals for the Seventh Circuit, and was on faculty at the University of Wisconsin Law School from 1976 to 1990. Subsequently, Fineman moved to Columbia Law School, where she was appointed as the Maurice T. Moore Professor of Law in 1990. She went on to become the first Dorothea S. Clarke Professor of Feminist Jurisprudence at Cornell Law School in 1999. Since 2004, she has been a Robert W. Woodruff Professor of Law at Emory University School of Law. The honor is "reserved for world-class scholars who are not only proven leaders of their own fields of specialty, but also ambitious bridge-builders across specialty disciplines."

== Feminism and Legal Theory Project ==
Fineman is the founding director of the Feminism and Legal Theory Project, which she founded in 1984 and which has been housed by the University of Wisconsin Law School, Columbia Law School, Cornell Law School, and Emory University School of Law. Fineman founded the FLT Project at the University of Wisconsin Law School and for the next six years the Project hosted an annual summer conference to "provide a forum for interdisciplinary feminist scholarship addressing important issues in law and society." Over time, Fineman expanded the scope of the Project – increasing the number and variety of annual workshops and presentations, and adding new programs.

Fineman seeks to bring together other feminists to validate established expertise and encourage newly emerging scholars. The Feminism and Legal Theory Project brings together scholars to study and debate a wide range of topics related to feminist theory and law. The FLT Project hosts four or five scholarly workshops per year with a core commitment "to foster interdisciplinary examinations of specific law and policy topics of particular interest to women." FLT Project inquiries do not address gender exclusively – project scholarship is concerned with equality issues related to the intersections of race, gender, class, sexuality and ability. The FLT Project published At the Boundaries of Law: Feminism and Legal Theory (1990) and Transcending the Boundaries of Law: Generations of Feminism and Legal Theory (2011) as well as other books.

== Vulnerability and the Human Condition Initiative ==
Fineman directs the Vulnerability and the Human Condition Initiative which was founded in 2008 at Emory Law School. This program hosts national and international workshops and visitors. Its purpose is to provide a forum for scholars interested in engaging the concepts of "vulnerability" and "resilience" and the idea of a "responsive state" in constructing a universal approach to address the human condition.

Fineman is an affiliated scholar of the Center for American Progress.

In September 2018, she was ranked the #1 Most-Cited Family Law Faculty in the U.S. for the period 2013-2017 on Brian Leiter's Law School Reports, based on Sisk Annual Report data.

== Work on dependency and vulnerability ==
She now focuses on the legal implications of universal dependency, vulnerability and justice.

In her 2004 book The Autonomy Myth: A Theory of Dependency, Fineman "argues that popular ideology in the United States has become fixated on the myth that citizens are and should be autonomous. Yet the fact that dependency is unavoidable in any society and must be dealt with to sustain the polity, Fineman contends, gives the state the responsibility to support caretaking."

Her 2008 article "The Vulnerable Subject" in the Yale Journal of Law and Feminism forms the basis for her 2011 book, also titled The Vulnerable Subject.

Fineman argues:

Vulnerability is and should be understood to be universal and constant, inherent in the human condition. The vulnerability approach is an alternative to traditional equal protection analysis; it represents a post-identity inquiry in that it is not focused only on discrimination against defined groups, but concerned with privilege and favor conferred on limited segments of the population by the state and broader society through their institutions. As such, vulnerability analysis concentrates on the institutions and structures our society has and will establish to manage our common vulnerabilities. This approach has the potential to move us beyond the stifling confines of current discrimination-based models toward a more substantive vision of equality.

According to Selberg and Wegerstad,

Fundamental to Fineman's scholarly work is a feminist critique of notions of equality, the liberal subject and prevailing anti-discrimination politics. According to Fineman, the current anti-discrimination doctrine assumes that discrimination is the discoverable and correctable exception to an otherwise just and fair system, characterized by values such as individual liberty and autonomy. Developing her work on dependency, Fineman raises the question: if our bodily fragility, material needs, and the possibility of messy dependency they signify cannot be ignored in life, how can they be absent in our theories about equality, society, politics and law?' Moving beyond gender and other identity categories, Fineman uses the concept of vulnerability to 'define the very meaning of what it means to be human.'

Expanding on Fineman's framework, Reilly, Bjørnholt and Tastsoglou propose an "expanded, critical and heuristic vulnerability approach, which integrates key insights of 'situated intersectionality' along with a deep understanding of structural and discursively produced forms of oppression as revealed by the precarity approach."

== Awards and recognitions ==
Fineman is the recipient of the 2008 Cook Award from the School of Industrial and Labor Relations at Cornell University and the 2006–2007 Leverhulme Visiting Professorship. She is the recipient of the Harry Kalven Prize, awarded by the Law and Society Association to a scholar whose body of "empirical scholarship has contributed most effectively to the advancement of research in law and society." In March 2004, a symposium of some 500 scholars and students gathered at Emory University School of Law to celebrate the scholarship of its three Robert W. Woodruff Professors of Law, Harold J. Berman, Martha Albertson Fineman, and Michael J. Perry, and Visiting Professor Martin E. Marty.

In 2010, Fineman held a Marie Curie Fellowship at the UCD Equality Studies Center which was awarded by the European Union. In 2012, Fineman held the Cecil H. and Ida Green Visiting Professorship at the University of British Columbia. In 2013, Lund University awarded her an honorary doctorate. The Faculty of Law named Fineman and former Swedish Chief Justice Johan Munck as its new honorary doctors in 2013.

In 2017, Fineman was awarded the Ruth Bader Ginsburg Lifetime Achievement Award by the Association of American Law Schools. Additionally, she held a Neilson Professorship at the Kahn Liberal Arts Institute at Smith College and was named a Lifetime Fellow by the American Bar Foundation. In 2018, she was awarded Albany Law School's Miriam M. Netter '72 Stoneman Award in recognition of her efforts to expand opportunities for women.

For 2020-2021, Fineman is a Distinguished Lecturer at the Hagler Institute for Advanced Study at Texas A&M University.

== Legal scholarship ==
Fineman has been listed in the top ten most cited scholars in multiple areas of legal scholarship, including critical legal theory and family law.

Fineman's recent publications include "Reasoning from the Body," in Jurisprudence of the Body, Palgrave Press: M.A. Thomson, M. Travis Eds. (forthcoming 2020); "The Limits of Equality: Vulnerability and Inevitable Inequality," in FEMINIST JURISPRUDENCE, Elgar Press: Bowman, C. and West, R. Eds. (2019); and Culture," in Injury and Injustice: The Cultural Politics of Harm and Redress, Cambridge University Press: A. Bloom, D. Engel, M. McCann eds. (2018).

== Publications ==
=== Books ===
- The Autonomy Myth: A Theory of Dependency (The New Press, 2004)
- The Neutered Mother, the Sexual Family, and Other Twentieth Century Tragedies (Routledge, 1995)
- The Illusion of Equality: The Rhetoric and Reality of Divorce Reform (University of Chicago Press, 1991).

Fineman has edited or co-edited the following legal theory volumes:

- Vulnerability: Reflections on a New Ethical Foundation for Law and Politics (Ashgate, 2014; co-editor Anna Grear)
- Transcending the Boundaries of Law: Generations of Feminism and Legal Theory (Routledge, 2010)
- What Is Right for Children? The Competing Paradigms of Religion and Human Rights (Ashgate, 2009; co-editor Karen Worthington)
- Feminist and Queer Legal Theory: Intimate Encounters, Uncomfortable Conversations (Ashgate, 2009, co-editors Jack E. Jackson and Adam P. Romero)
- Feminism Confronts Homo Economicus: Gender, Law, and Society (Cornell University Press, 2005; co-editor Terrance Doherty)
- Feminism, Media, and the Law (Oxford University Press, 1997; co-editor Martha T. McCluskey)
- Mothers in Law: Feminism and the Legal Regulation of Motherhood (Columbia University Press, 1995; co-editor Isabel Karpin)
- The Public Nature of Private Violence: Women and the Discovery of Abuse (Routledge, 1994, co-editor Roxanne Mykitiuk)
- At the Boundaries of Law: Feminism and Legal Theory (Routledge, 1990, co-editor Nancy Sweet Thomadsen). At the Boundaries of Law is the first volume of feminist legal theory.
- Feminist Perspectives on Transitional Justice: Through a Theoretical, Policy and Practice-Oriented Lens (with E. Zinsstag), Intersentia Press (Series on Transitional Justice 2013).
- Masculinities and Feminisms: Critical Perspectives (with M. Thomson), Ashgate Press 2013.
- Privatization, Vulnerability, and Social Responsibility: A Comparative Perspective (with U. Andersson and T. Mattsson), Routledge 2017.
- Vulnerability and the Legal Organization of Work (with J. Fineman), Routledge 2019.

Fineman has written book reviews including:

- "Family Values: Between Neoliberalism and the New Social Conservatism," 25th Anniversary Issue of Social & Legal Studies Vol. 26(6) (2017).
- "The Hermeneutics of Reason: A Commentary on Sex and Reason, 25 University of Connecticut Law Review 503 (1993).
- "Justice, Gender and the Family" Ethics (1991).
- "Unmythological Procedure" 63 University of Southern California Law Review 141 (1989).
- "Neither Silent, Nor Revolutionary." Law and Society Review (1989).
- "Illusive Equality: Review of The Divorce Revolution, The Unexpected Social and Economic Consequences for Women and Children in America" American Bar Foundation Research Journal 781 (1986).
- "Contexts and Comparisons" 55 University of Chicago Law Review 1431 (1988).

=== Journal articles ===
Recent articles include "Vulnerability in Law and Bioethics," 30 Journal of Health Care for the Poor and Underserved 52 (2020); "Beyond Equality and Discrimination," 73 SMU Law Review Forum 51 (2020); "Vulnerability and Social Justice," 53 Valparaiso Law Review 341 (2019); "Vulnerability and Inevitable Inequality," Oslo Law Review (peer reviewed, 2017); and "Homeschooling the Vulnerable Child" – University of Baltimore Law Review (2016 with George Shepherd).

=== Other ===
- "Having a child is nothing like deciding to buy a Porsche" in The Guardian (December 1, 2013)

== Lectures and presentations ==
- Seeger Lecture on Jurisprudence, Valparaiso University (2017)
- Anne E. Hirsch Centennial Lecture, New England School of Law (2008)
- Emory University – Life of the Mind Lecture (2008)
- Cornell University – Alice Cook Lecture(2008)
- Panelist and Discussant for the Tanner Lectures (Lecturer was Sarah Hrdy), University of Utah (2001)
- Vulnerability and the Human Condition: A Different Approach to Equality, featuring Robert W. Woodruff Professor of Law and Director of the Feminism and Legal Theory Project, Martha Albertson Fineman, https://www.youtube.com/watch?v=seC6hqnpkPU
- Feminism, Masculinities, and Multiple Identities, featuring Martha Fineman and Elizabeth F. Emens. https://www.youtube.com/watch?v=nEWUMFF5_WQ

Academic offices
Preceded by Albert J. Rosenthal	Maurice T. Moore Professor of Law at Columbia Law School; 1990 – 1999	Succeeded by
Preceded by First holder of chair	Dorothea S. Clarke Professor of Feminist Jurisprudence at Cornell Law School; 1999 – 2004	Succeeded by Cynthia Grant Bowman
Preceded by	Robert W. Woodruff Professor of Law at Emory Law; 2004 –	Succeeded by
