= Feminist interventions in the philosophy of law =

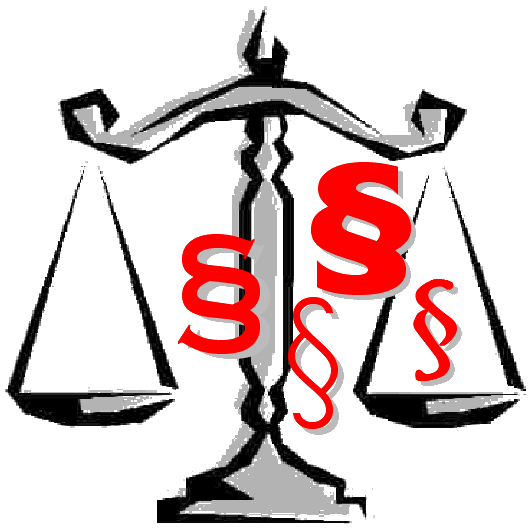

Feminist interventions in the philosophy of law concern the examination and reformulation of traditional legal systems in order to better reflect the political, social, and economic concerns of women---which also includes various other minority and ethnic groups. Though it draws heavily from feminist legal theory, feminist interventions in the philosophy of law differs from the more common feminist jurisprudence as it also seeks to explain the justification that a government has in interfering with the lives of its citizenry. Accordingly, then, feminist interventions in legal philosophy specifically addresses the relationship and rationale between a judicial system's exercise of power and its effects on female citizens. While particular views vary greatly, most feminist interventions in the philosophy of law operate under a belief that many contemporary legal systems are predicated on patriarchal notions of masculinity that result in a system of deeply-rooted bias and inequality.

== The rule of law ==
The rule of law is generally defined as the fundamental principle that both government and its citizens all operate under a system of general and fair rules that are publicly disclosed. In relation to feminism, feminist philosophers of law typically perceive the current iteration of the rule of law as an institution that perpetuates primarily patriarchal norms, or in terms of power relationships that have been primarily been dominated by males. As such, they perceive the current normativity of law as perpetuating male values as the status quo. Though feminists maintain several different positions in terms of how to address these issues, it is almost universally agreed that these patriarchal structures cannot be properly challenged until their underlying biases are fully exposed.

== Role of intervention by ideology ==
As in traditional feminist jurisprudence, feminists hold several competing philosophical positions in regards to ways the law should work to better accommodate women.

=== Cultural feminism ===
Cultural feminists contend that the solution to attaining legal equality must come from procedural reform that embraces the differences between men and women. The challenge here derives from acknowledging various differences between men and women without further reinforcing gender stereotypes or promoting sexist practices. As such, the government must intervene insofar as it promotes laws that embrace only the immutable differences between the sexes—such as pregnancy—with the ultimate goal being equal recognition to women's moral voice of caring and communal values. Specifically, whereas women emphasize the importance of relationships and reconciliation of conflicting positions, men emphasize more abstract principles such as rights and logic. Thus, cultural feminists see their intervention into law as a means to achieve balance and reconciliation between the two.

=== Liberal feminism ===
Liberal feminists believe women and men possess the same rational capabilities and have no fundamental differences in capability; therefore, they assert that women should have equal opportunity as men to the extent that some liberal feminists believe there should be no legal distinctions between men or women. Accordingly, the law's role, according to the liberal feminist, should strive for the utmost equality between men and women. This is because liberal feminists believe that women have long been denied the same bodily autonomy that has been enjoyed by their male counterparts. Such issues manifest themselves in the form of the debate on whether or not the law ought to legally recognize industries like prostitution as a legitimate entity.

Another noteworthy area in law where parity is specifically desired is in the "standards of reasonableness" that are used in criminal, contract, and tort law, which liberal feminists argue are predicated on masculine assumptions of what is "reasonable". Thus, liberal feminists seek to articulate how this masculine norm accordingly affects those aspects of law in regards to judging women or other feminine groups as "reasonable" in trial.

Furthermore, liberal feminists also place a particular value on intersectionality theories. The primary reason for this growing movement is that keeping categories such as race and sex separate often made such persons "invisible" by making it more difficult to exact equality for persons who were oppressed for their gender, race, or class.

=== Dominant feminism ===
Dominant, or radical, feminists maintain that there are differences between men and women, but these differences do not derive from innate differences between men and women; rather, such differences come as a result of women being subjugated by men in larger society. As such, it is not merely enough to embrace the differences between men and women: sexual equality under the rule of law must be established upon a female paradigm that cannot simply be an addition to the current paradigm of masculinity. In terms of philosophical interventions, dominant feminists contend that a systemic reevaluation must take place within any legal system that operates to subjugate women. Moreover, the law must be constructed in such a way that it does not work to a disparate effect of either sex.

== Types of intervention in the United States ==
=== Bodily autonomy ===
Feminist interventions concerning women's issues of bodily autonomy cover a wide range of legal topics, such as abortion, prostitution, and rape.

==== Abortion ====
Several American legal feminists have expressed approval of the Supreme Court's 1973 decision in Roe v. Wade, which guaranteed the right to have an abortion in the United States. Lucinda Peach, for example, argued in her 2002 essay that controlling one's own body was a necessary condition for any other freedom. Other scholars, though generally accepting of the Court's decision, have nevertheless argued that the Court's opinion was based upon "paternalistic attitudes" regarding women.

Yet, other feminist legal commentators have acknowledged the difficulties associated with the legalization of abortion in the United States. For example, certain feminists concerned with the rights of the disabled argue that abortion decisions that are based on inadequate or biased information about disabilities are inherently problematic. Likewise, certain feminists of color are more concerned with whether some abortion policies themselves are racially biased, implicitly or even explicitly. Some scholars have even gone as far as to suggest that Roe v. Wade "was not a victory for women but a victory for the medical profession; it gave physicians, not women, the right to make abortion decisions."

==== Prostitution ====
Some legal feminists have argued that markets which cater specifically to sexual services should be banned by the state. This is because such markets are viewed as exploitative of marginalized classes of people and pose numerous risks to its workers. In her essay published in 2010, Debrah Satz argued that feminist interventions in the law should be opposed to the legalization of prostitution, as prostitution often employs people from stigmatized or disempowered social classes, fails to create conditions for informed consent, endangers the health of its participants, and reinforces invidious stereotypes about women or other groups. Similarly, Carole Pateman has argued that, because people's bodies and sexual capacities are an integral part of their identity, the woman who works as a prostitute sells her womanhood and, consequently, her very self.

Martha Nussbaum—who is a Professor of Law and Ethics at the University of Chicago—has devoted several of her publications to explaining why the social stigma associated with sex work is irrational. As she believes it, feminists should oppose the stigmatization of sex work, rather than oppose sex work for its contribution to the stigmatization of women. Furthermore, Nussbaum speculated that the problems associated with prostitution are reflective of many other social practices, and that these social practices are not inherent to prostitution but are often a function of the prostitute's working conditions and treatment by others.

== Notable feminist legal interventionists ==
- Catharine MacKinnon is a prominent American legal activist who graduated from Yale Law School. Her work focuses on sexual equality, women's rights, and various feminist interventions into the law in areas like pornography, prostitution, and politics. She is currently a professor of law at the University of Michigan.
- Martha Fineman is the founder of the Feminism and Legal Theory Project. She is a prominent legal scholar who received her law degree from University of Chicago. Much of her work and scholarship has been especially focused in the area of family law.
- Kim Lane Scheppele is a professor of Comparative Law and Sociology at the University of Pennsylvania Law School. While her expertise is primarily Hungarian politics, Scheppele wrote an essay in 2004 arguing that current tort and criminal law standards of a "reasonable person" are predicated on being a "reasonable man".
