= Anna Grear =

English academic, author, and activist (born 1959)

Professor Anna Maria Grear
- Born: 4 September 1959 (age 67); British Protectorate of Aden

Academic background
- Education: University of Bristol (1979–1982); Oxford Brookes University (1995–1997); University of Oxford (1997–1999)

Academic work
- School or tradition: Jurisprudence, Political Theory, Philosophical Foundations of the Common Law (Contract and Tort), Comparative Public Law, Comparative Human Rights
- Institutions: Oxford Brookes University (2000–2006); University of the West of England (2006–2012); University of Waikato (2012–); Cardiff University (2013–2023)
- Main interests: Human Rights, Human Rights and the Environment, Climate Injustice, Legal Subjectivity, New Materialist Legal Theory

Anna Maria Grear (born 4 September 1959) is an English academic, author, and political activist. Grear is the founder of several academic and activist organisations, including the Global Network for the Study of Human Rights and the Environment (GNHRE) and the Journal of Human Rights and the Environment, where she is editor-in-chief. Grear is adjunct professor of law at the University of Waikato and was professor of law and theory at Cardiff University until 2023. She has written for such international newspapers as The Wire and Süddeutsche Zeitung. She is also the owner of HypnoCatalyst, an organisation specialising in integrative psychotherapy.

== Biography ==
=== Education ===
Grear received an LL.B with honours from the University of Bristol, an LL.D. from Oxford Brookes University and a first class B.C.L. from St Hilda's College, Oxford.

=== Professorships and jurisprudence ===
Grear was senior lecturer in law at Oxford Brookes University from May 2000 to January 2006, senior lecturer in law at the University of the West of England from February 2006 to January 2012, and associate professor of law at the University of Waikato from February 2012 to June 2013. In 2013, she took up a post as reader in law at Cardiff University, where she later held a personal chair as professor of law and theory until 31 August 2023.

Grear holds professional memberships at several international institutions. She is an invited professor at the Westminster Centre for Law and Theory, a member of the Dahrendorf Network in Berlin, and a member of the United Nations' Sustainable Development Solutions Network. Additionally, Grear is adjunct professor of law at the University of Waikato, an associate fellow of the New Economy Law Centre at Vermont Law School, and a global affiliate to the Vulnerability and the Human Condition Initiative at Emory University.

Grear's academic work focuses on a range of issues around law's dominant imaginary, the way it constructs the world, imagines the human and the more-than-human. Her work therefore embraces questions around legal subjectivity, the meaning of the human, the significance of materiality for law and theory, rights theory, human rights theory and human rights and the environment.

=== Political and environmental activism ===
In March 2010, Grear founded the Journal of Human Rights and the Environment, a double-blind peer-reviewed scholarly journal. She has served as editor-in-chief ever since.

With Professor Tom Kerns, Grear co-initiated the Permanent Peoples' Tribunal on Climate Change, Fracking and Human Rights. The online tribunal hearings were streamed globally from 14 to 18 May 2018 in a first for the Permanent Peoples' Tribunal. The Advisory Opinion recommended a world-wide ban on fracking. Commenting on the tribunal, Grear said "the PPT will play a unique and vitally important role in presenting and rehearsing testimony, arguments and law to lay down an informal but highly expert precedent, with potential for future use in national and international courts of law. The PPT will also educate a wide range of parties and the general public about the human rights dimensions of fracking. This really is a Peoples' tribunal. It belongs to communities and individuals from all over the world and it aims to produce a highly influential, legally literate and serious judgement of the issues by some of the world’s finest legal minds as a trail blazing example for future legal actions, when and where appropriate."

In 2018, Grear was one of 1,400 academics who wrote to The Sunday Times urging that Britain remain in the European Union.

=== Other work ===
In January 2010, Grear founded the Global Network for the Study of Human Rights and the Environment (GNHRE), an international network for scholars, policy-makers and activists "for the creation of change", where she is now former director.

In 2014, she co-founded Incredible Edible Bristol, an urban food-growing movement, with horticulturist Sara Venn.

In 2022, Grear hosted a summit on fatigue, linking fatigue to planetary and environmental exhaustion, toxicities of contemporary life and to shifts in human consciousness. Guests included leading health and recovery experts, as well as a couple of scholars working with environmental themes, posthumanism and critical theory. Grear has since started a podcast, 'The Fatigue Files', which continues the exploration of the summit themes.

Grear also works as an integrative therapeutic coach. She is the owner of HypnoCatalyst, an independent online programme for people suffering from longterm, complex and chronic fatigue conditions.

=== Honours ===
In 2007, Grear was awarded one of six visiting scholarships at St John's College, Oxford, which involved a competitive application process, alongside Benedict Read and Henrike Lähnemann. Similarly competitive, she was awarded an international seminar by the International Institute for the Sociology of Law in Oñati, Spain, in 2011. In the intervening years, she was appointed to several fellowships and professorships internationally, and in 2018 she was shortlisted for an IUCN Academy of Environmental Law Senior Scholarship Award.

== Publications ==
- Grear, Anna and D Kwek, New Materialist Tangles in and for the Anthropocene (Edward Elgar Publishing, Cheltenham, 2025).
- Grear, Anna (2 July 2024). "Flat ontology and differentiation: in defence of Bennett's vital materialism, and some thoughts towards decolonial new materialisms for international law". International Law and Posthuman Theory. Abingdon-on-Thames: Routledge: 60–82. ISBN 9781032658025.
- Grear, Anna (22 May 2023). "International Law, Legal Anthropocentrism, and Facing the Planetary". The Routledge Handbook of International Law and Anthropocentrism. Abingdon-on-Thames: Routledge. pp. 165–182. doi:10.4324/9781003201120-11. ISBN 9780367858223.
- Grear, Anna (18 May 2023). "Law, Responsibility and the Capitalocene: In Search of New Arts of Living". The Routledge Handbook of Law and the Anthropocene. Routledge. ISBN 9780367439781.
- Grear, Anna (March 2023). "Quiet revolutions from necessary evolutions? Four contemporary normative developments". Journal of Human Rights and the Environment. 14 (1): 1–3. Bibcode:2023JHRE...14....1.. doi:10.4337/jhre.2023.01.00.
- Grear, Anna (17 November 2022). "Human Rights and the Environment: A Tale of Ambivalence and Hope". Research Handbook on Fundamental Concepts of Environmental Law. Edward Elgar Publishing. pp. 123–140. doi:10.4337/9781839108327.00011. ISBN 978-1-83910-832-7.
- Grear, Anna (October 2022). "Editorial: Against closure: in search of pluralities and breakthroughs". Journal of Human Rights and the Environment. 13 (2): 321–323. Bibcode:2022JHRE...13Q...0.. doi:10.4337/jhre.2022.02.00.
- Grear, Anna; Boulot, Emille; Vargas-Roncancio, Iván D.; Sterlin, Joshua (14 December 2021). Posthuman Legalities: New Materialism and Law Beyond the Human. Edward Elgar Publishing. ISBN 978-1-80220-334-9.
- Grear, Anna (2020). "Embracing Vulnerability: Notes Towards Human Rights for a More-Than-Human World". Embracing Vulnerability: The Challenges and Implications for Law. London: Routledge: 22. doi:10.4324/9781351105705-15. ISBN 9781351105705.
- Grear, Anna (2020). Environmental Justice (PDF).
- Grear, Anna (2020). "Resisting anthropocene neoliberalism: Towards new materialist commoning?". The Great Awakening: New Modes of Life Amidst Capitalist Ruins. Brooklyn: Punctum Press: 317–356. doi:10.2307/jj.2353884.13. ISBN 9781953035080.
- Grear, Anna; Bollier, David (8 October 2020). The Great Awakening: New Modes of Life Amidst Capitalist Ruins. Punctum Books. ISBN 978-1953035080.
- Grear, Anna (3 October 2020). "Legal Imaginaries and the Anthropocene: 'Of' and 'For'". Law and Critique. 31 (3): 351–366. doi:10.1007/s10978-020-09275-7.
- Grear, Anna; Dehm, Julia (March 2020). "Editorial: Frames and contestations: environment, climate change and the construction of in/justice". Journal of Human Rights and the Environment. 11 (1): 1–5. Bibcode:2020JHRE...11....1.. doi:10.4337/jhre.2020.01.00.
- Grear, Anna (2019). "Ecological Publics: Imagining epistemic openness". On Public Imagination. Routledge. doi:10.4324/9780429343599-18. ISBN 9780429343599.
- Grear, Anna; Blanco, Elena (March 2019). "Personhood, jurisdiction and injustice: law, colonialities and the global order". Journal of Human Rights and the Environment. 10 (1): 86–117. Bibcode:2019JHRE...10...86B. doi:10.4337/jhre.2019.01.05.
- Grear, Anna (18 March 2019). "It's Wrongheaded to Protect Nature with Human-Style Rights". Center for Humans and Nature.
- Grear, Anna (2018). "'Anthropocene "Time"?' – A reflection on temporalities in the 'New Age of the Human'". Routledge Handbook of Law and Theory. Routledge. pp. 297–315. doi:10.4324/9781315665733-15. ISBN 9781315665733.
- Grear, Anna (August 2018). "Human Rights and Radical Social Transformation: Futurity, Alterity, Power by Kathryn McNeilly (review)". Human Rights Quarterly. 40 (3). Johns Hopkins University Press: 710–716. doi:10.1353/hrq.2018.0039.
- Grear, Anna (January 2018). "Human Rights and New Horizons? Thoughts toward a New Juridical Ontology". Special Issue: New Technologies, Developments in the Biosciences and the New Frontiers of Human Rights. 43 (1): 129–145. doi:10.1177/0162243917736140.
- Grear, Anna; Otto, Dianne (23 November 2018). "International Law, Social Change and Resistance: A Conversation Between Professor Anna Grear (Cardiff) and Professorial Fellow Dianne Otto (Melbourne)". Feminist Legal Studies. 26 (3): 351–363. doi:10.1007/s10691-018-9393-0.
- Grear, Anna (2017). "'Anthropocene, Capitalocene, Chthulucene': Re-encountering environmental law and its 'subject' with Haraway and New Materialism'". Re-Imagining Environmental Law and Governance for the Anthropocene. Oxford: Hart Publishing.
- Grear, Anna (24 November 2017). "Foregrounding vulnerability: Materiality's porous affectability as a methodological platform". Handbook of Research Methods in Environmental Law. Cheltenham: Edward Elgar Publishing. pp. 3–28. doi:10.4337/9781784712570.00007. ISBN 9781784712563.
- Grear, Anna (2 November 2017). "Crisis, Injustice and Response". Journal of Human Rights and the Environment. 8 (2): 177–180. Bibcode:2017JHRE....8..177G. doi:10.4337/jhre.2017.02.00.
- Grear, Anna; Davies, Kirsten; Adelman, Sam; Magallanes, Catherine Iorns; Kerns, Tom; Rajan, S Ravi (September 2017). "The Declaration on Human Rights and Climate Change: a new legal tool for global policy change". Journal of Human Rights and the Environment. 8 (2): 217–253. Bibcode:2017JHRE....8..217D. doi:10.4337/jhre.2017.02.03.
- Grear, Anna; Weston, Burns (2016). "Human rights accountability in domestic courts: corporations and extraterritoriality". Human Rights in the World Community: Issues and Action. 4. Pennsylvania: University of Pennsylvania Press: 353–366.
- Grear, Anna (25 November 2016). "Human rights and the environment: a tale of ambivalence and hope". Research Handbook on Fundamental Concepts of Environmental Law. pp. 146–167. doi:10.4337/9781784714659.00012. ISBN 978-1-78471-465-9.
- Grear, Anna; Kotzé, Louis J. (2015). Research Handbook on Human Rights and the Environment. Edward Elgar Publishing. ISBN 978-1-78254-442-5.
- Grear, Anna (31 July 2015). "Towards new legal futures? In search of renewing foundations". Thought, Law, Rights and Action in the Age of Environmental Crisis: 283–314. doi:10.4337/9781784711337.00020. ISBN 978-1-78471-133-7.
- Grear, Anna; Grant, Evadne (31 July 2015). Thought, Law, Rights and Action in the Age of Environmental Crisis. Edward Elgar Publishing. ISBN 978-1784711337.
- Grear, Anna; Kotzé, Louis J. (26 June 2015). "An invitation to fellow epistemic travellers – towards future worlds in waiting: human rights and the environment in the twenty-first century". Research Handbook on Human Rights and the Environment. pp. 1–6. doi:10.4337/9781782544432.00005. ISBN 978-1-78254-443-2.
- Grear, Anna (26 June 2015). "The closures of legal subjectivity: why examining 'law's person' is critical to an understanding of injustice in an age of climate crisis". Research Handbook on Human Rights and the Environment. pp. 79–101. doi:10.4337/9781782544432.00012. ISBN 978-1-78254-443-2.
- Grear, Anna (20 May 2015). "Deconstructing Anthropos: A Critical Legal Reflection on 'Anthropocentric' Law and Anthropocene 'Humanity'". Law and Critique. 26 (3): 225–249. doi:10.1007/s10978-015-9161-0.
- Grear, Anna (March 2015). "The Discourse of Biocultural Rights and the Search for New Epistemic Parameters: Moving beyond Essentialisms and Old Certainties in an Age of Antropocene Complexity". Journal of Human Rights and the Environment. 6 (1): 1–6. doi:10.4337/jhre.2015.01.00.
- Grear, Anna; Weston, Burns H. (25 February 2015). "The Betrayal of Human Rights and the Urgency of Universal Corporate Accountability: Reflections on a Post-Kiobel Lawscape". Human Rights Law Review. 15 (1): 21–44. doi:10.1093/hrlr/ngu044.
- Grear, Anna (1 September 2015). "Penelope Simons and Audrey Macklin, The Governance Gap: Extractive Industries, Human Rights, and the Home State Advantage". Human Rights Law Review. 15 (3): 607–611. doi:10.1093/hrlr/ngv018. ISBN 978-0-415-33470-9.
- Grear, Anna (7 May 2015). "Law's Entities: Complexity, Plasticity and Justice". Jurisprudence. 4 (1): 76–101. doi:10.5235/20403313.4.1.76. hdl:10289/7687.
- Grear, Anna (27 June 2014). "Towards 'climate justice'? A critical reflection on legal subjectivity and climate injustice: warning signals, patterned hierarchies, directions for future law and policy". Choosing a Future: 103–133. doi:10.4337/9781784711900.00013. ISBN 9781783477234.
- Grear, Anna; Fineman, Martha Albertson (January 2014). Vulnerability: Reflections on a New Ethical Foundation for Law and Politics. Ashgate Publishing. ISBN 9781472421654. Archived from the original on 4 December 2013.
- Grear, Anna; Knox, John; Gearty, Conor; Shue, Henry; Robinson, Mary; De Schutter, Olivier; Humphreys, Stephen; Hedahl, Marcus; Hedegaard, Connie (28 January 2014). "Choosing a Future: Social and Legal Aspects of Climate Change". Journal of Human Rights and the Environment. 5: 1. Bibcode:2014JHRE....5....1G. doi:10.4337/jhre.2014.02.00.
- Grear, Anna; Grant, Evadne; Kerns, Tom; Morrow, Karen L.; Short, Damien (1 January 2014). A human rights assessment of hydraulic fracturing and other unconventional gas development in the United Kingdom.
- Grear, Anna (2013). "Vulnerability, advanced global capitalism and co-symptomatic injustice: locating the vulnerable subject". Vulnerability: Reflections on a New Ethical Foundation for Law and Politics. Farnham: Ashgate Publishing: 41–60. ISBN 9781472421654.
- Grear, Anna (2013). "Climate justice involves more than a fair distribution of benefits and burdens: It requires radical, structural change". Blog.
- Grear, Anna (September 2013). "Human Bodies in Material Space: Lived Realities, Eco-Crisis and the Search for Transformation". Journal of Human Rights and the Environment. 4 (2): 111–115. Bibcode:2013JHRE....4..111.. doi:10.4337/jhre.2013.02.00.
- Grear, Anna (10 April 2013). "Towards a New Horizon: In Search of a Renewing Socio-Juridical Imaginary". Oñati Socio-Legal Series. 3 (5). SSRN 2247857.
- Grear, Anna; Fineman, Martha Albertson (6 December 2013). "Vulnerability as Heuristic – An Invitation to Future Exploration". Vulnerability: Reflections on a New Ethical Foundation for Law and Politics.
- Grear, Anna (2012). Should Trees Have Standing?: 40 Years On. Edward Elgar Publishing. ISBN 978-1-78100-919-2.
- Grear, Anna (12 December 2012). "Learning legal reasoning while rejecting the oxymoronic status of feminist judicial rationalities: a view from the law classroom". The Law Teacher. 46 (3): 239–254. doi:10.1080/03069400.2012.737251.
- Grear, Anna (22 November 2012). "'Framing the project' of international human rights law: reflections on the dysfunctional 'family' of the Universal Declaration". The Cambridge Companion to Human Rights Law. Cambridge University Press. pp. 17–35. doi:10.1017/CCO9781139060875.004. hdl:10289/7684. ISBN 978-1107495777.
- Grear, Anna (September 2012). "Human rights, property and the search for 'worlds other'". Journal of Human Rights and the Environment. 3 (2): 173–195. Bibcode:2012JHRE....3..173G. doi:10.4337/jhre.2012.03.01. hdl:10289/7686.
- Grear, Anna (2011). "Gender, Sexualities and Law: Critical Engagements". Gender, Sexualities and Law. Abingdon-on-Thames: Routledge: 1–11. ISBN 9780415574396.
- Grear, Anna (2011). "'Mind the Gap': One Dilemma Concerning the Expansion of Legal Subjectivity in the Age of Globalisation". Law, Crime & History. 1 (1): 1–8.
- Grear, Anna (2011). Three Feminist Critiques of Varying Feminist Capitulations to Crisis-Hegemony: Reflections on Otto, Mertus and Grahn-Farley. Hart Publishing.
- Grear, Anna (2011). "'Sexing the matrix': embodiment, disembodiment and the law – towards the re-gendering of legal rationality". Gender, Sexualities and Law. Routledge. doi:10.4324/9780203831427-10 (inactive 11 July 2025). ISBN 9780203831427.
- Grear, Anna (September 2011). "Editorial: Reflections on biodiversity and food supply: from the nano to the macro-political". Journal of Human Rights and the Environment. 2 (2): 131–135. Bibcode:2011JHRE....2..131G. doi:10.4337/jhre.2011.02.00.
- Grear, Anna (2011). "'Sexing the matrix': embodiment, disembodiment and the law – towards the re-gendering of legal rationality". Gender, Sexualities and Law. Routledge. doi:10.4324/9780203831427-10 (inactive 11 July 2025). ISBN 9780203831427.
- Grear, Anna (March 2011). "The vulnerable living order: human rights and the environment in a critical and philosophical perspective". Journal of Human Rights and the Environment. 2 (1): 23–44. Bibcode:2011JHRE....2...23G. doi:10.4337/jhre.2011.01.02.
- Grear, Anna (2010). "Multi-level governance for sustainability: reflections from a fractured discourse". New Zealand and the EU: Contested Futures: Sustainability, Governance and International Human Rights. Auckland: University of Auckland: 73–141.
- Grear, Anna; Macmillan, Palgrave (2010). Redirecting Human Rights: Facing the Challenge of Corporate Legal Humanity. Cambridge: Cambridge University Press. ISBN 9780230542228.
- Grear, Anna (1 January 2010). The missing feminist judgement in Rita Porter v commissioner of police for the metropolis. Hart Publishing. ISBN 9781849460538.
- Grear, Anna; Westra, L; Bosselmann, K; Westra, R (2009). "Reconciling human existence with ecological integrity". Journal of Environmental Law. 21 (2): 387–389. doi:10.1093/jel/eqp008.
- Grear, Anna (2008). "Quasi-Public Land". New Oxford Companion to Law. Oxford: Oxford University Press. p. 974.
- Grear, Anna (22 October 2008). "Choice and Consent: Feminist Engagements with Law and Subjectivity". Feminist Legal Studies. 16. Oxford: Routledge: 377–382. doi:10.1007/s10691-008-9104-3. ISBN 978-1904385851.
- Grear, Anna (3 July 2007). "Challenging Corporate 'Humanity': Legal Disembodiment, Embodiment and Human Rights". Human Rights Law Review. 7 (3): 511–543. doi:10.1093/hrlr/ngm013.
- Grear, Anna (July 2006). "Human Rights – Human Bodies? Some Reflections on Corporate Human Rights Distortion, The Legal Subject, Embodiment and Human Rights Theory". Law and Critique. 17 (2): 171–199. doi:10.1007/s10978-006-0006-8.
- Grear, Anna (January 2004). "The curate, a cleft palate and ideological closure in the Abortion Act 1967–time to reconsider the relationship between doctors and the abortion decision". Web Journal of Current Legal Issues. 4. University of Newcastle upon Tyne: 12.
- Grear, Anna (March 2003). "A tale of the land, the insider, the outsider and human rights (an exploration of some problems and possibilities in the relationship between the English common law property concept, human rights law, and discourses of exclusion and inclusion)". Legal Studies. 23 (1). Cambridge: Cambridge University Press: 33–65. doi:10.1111/j.1748-121X.2003.tb00205.x.
- Grear, Anna (May 2003). "Theorising the Rainbow? The Puzzle of the Public-private Divide". Res Publica. 9 (2): 169–194. doi:10.1023/A:1024125527021.
