= Professor of Jurisprudence =

The title of Professor of Jurisprudence may refer to one of the following academic positions:

- Professor of Jurisprudence (Glasgow), founded at the University of Glasgow in 1952
- Professor of Jurisprudence (University of Oxford) (formerly known as the "Corpus Professor of Jurisprudence"), founded in 1869
- Dorothea S. Clarke Professor of Feminist Jurisprudence at Cornell Law School
