= Janet L. Jacobs =

American sociologist

Janet Liebman Jacobs
- Born: 1948 (age 77–78)
- Education: BS, MPA, PhD
- Alma mater: University of Colorado
- Known for: Interdisciplinary research in gender, religion and trauma studies
- Awards: Distinguished book award from the Society for the Scientific Study of Religion, Hazel Barnes Prize, Outstanding Book Award in 2017 from the American Sociological Association
- Scientific career
- Fields: Sociology, Sociology of Religion, Trauma in Society, Gender Analysis
- Institutions: University of Colorado

For the American former baseball player, see Janet Jacobs.

Janet Liebman Jacobs (born 1948) is an American sociologist specializing in gender and religion. Jacobs' research focuses on women, religion, ethnicity, genocide and the social psychology of gender. She has authored seven books, including Hidden Heritage: The Legacy of the Crypto-Jews, for which she won the Distinguished Book Award from the Society for the Scientific Study of Religion, Memorializing the Holocaust: Gender, Genocide and Collective Memory, and The Holocaust Across Generations: Trauma and its Inheritance Among Descendants of Survivors, for which she won the 2017 Outstanding Book Award from the American Sociological Association.

Jacobs is currently Professor of Sociology and of Women and Gender Studies at the University of Colorado, and she directs the University of Colorado Honors Program. She received her PhD from the University of Colorado in 1985.

== Career ==
Jacobs earned a Bachelor of Science in journalism in 1970, a Master of Public Administration degree in 1977, and a PhD in sociology at the University of Colorado in 1985. Jacobs is a tenured full professor in the Department of Sociology and professor of Women's Studies at the University of Colorado Boulder. She served as the director of the Women's Studies Program at this institution in 1987-1988 and again during 1997–2000; she also served as director of the Farrand Academic Program from 2005 to 2011. Since 2014 Jacobs has directed the University of Colorado College of Arts and Sciences Honors Program. Jacobs chaired the committee and has supervised research for graduates of the University of Colorado, Boulder and has received Teaching Excellence Awards from the University of Colorado in 1985, 1992 and 2001.

== Selected bibliography ==
=== Books ===
- Janet Jacobs (3 January 2017). The Holocaust Across Generations: Trauma and Its Inheritance Among Descendants of Survivors. NYU Press. ISBN 978-1-4798-3356-6.
- Janet Jacobs (30 July 2010). Memorializing the Holocaust: Gender, Genocide and Collective Memory. I.B.Tauris. pp. 5–. ISBN 978-0-85771-811-2.
- Janet Liebman Jacobs (2002). Hidden Heritage: The Legacy of the Crypto-Jews. University of California Press. ISBN 978-0-520-23346-1.
- Jacobs, Janet (1997). Religion, Society and Psychoanalysis. Westview Press. Archived from the original on 2016-12-20.
- Jacobs, Janet (1995). William James: The Struggle for Life. Princeton University Monograph. ISBN 1882380029.
- Jacobs, Janet (1994). Victimized Daughters: Incest and the Development of the Female Self. Routledge. ISBN 978-0-415-90626-5. Archived from the original on April 14, 2015.
- Jacobs, Janet (1989). Divine Disenchantment: Deconversion from New Religious Movements. Indiana University Press. ISBN 978-0253323965.

=== Book chapters ===
- "Religious Ritual and Mental Health," John Schumaker, ed., Religion and Mental Health (New York: Oxford University Press, 1992), pages 291–294.
- "Sexual Abuse in New Religious Movements: Challenges for the Sociology of Religion" in Bromley, David (2007). Teaching New Religious Movements. Oxford University Press. ISBN 978-0195177299.
- "Gender Representation and the Objectification of Jewish Women at Majdanek" in Steir, Oren (2006). Religion, violence, memory, and place. Indiana University Press. ISBN 978-0253347992. LCCN 2006019152.
- "Reassessing Freud: Gender, Ethnicity and the Production of Scientific Thought" in Jonte-Pace, Diane (2003). Teaching Freud. Oxford University Press. ISBN 0195157680.

=== Journal articles ===
- Jacobs, Janet L. "The Memorial at Srebrenica: Gender and the Social Meanings of Collective Memory in Bosnia-Herzegovina," Memory Studies, June 5, 2016.
- Jacobs, Janet L. "Sites of Terror and the Role of Memory in Shaping Identity Among First Generation Descendants of the Holocaust", Qualitative Sociology 37 (Spring 2014): pages 27–42.
- Jacobs, Janet L. "The Cross Generational Transmission of Trauma: Ritual and Emotion Among Survivors of the Holocaust," Journal of Contemporary Ethnography 40 (Spring 2011): pages 342–361; reprinted in Religion on the Edge: De-Centering and Re-Centering the Sociology of Religion (Oxford University Press, 2013).
- Jacobs, Janet L. "Memoralizing the Sacred: Kristallnacht in German National Memory," Journal for the Scientific Study of Religion 47 (Fall 2008): pages 485–498.
- Jacobs, Janet L. "Gender, Race, Class, and the Trend Toward Early Motherhood: A Feminist Analysis of Teen Mothers in Contemporary Society." Journal of contemporary ethnography 22.4 (1994): pages 442–462.
- Jacobs, Janet L. "The effects of ritual healing on female victims of abuse: A study of empowerment and transformation." Sociology of Religion 50.3 (1989): pages 265–279.
- Jacobs, Janet Liebman. "Reassessing mother blame in incest." Signs (1990): pages 500–514.
- Jacobs, Janet L. "Gender and power in new religious movements: A feminist discourse on the scientific study of religion 1." Religion 21.4 (1991): pages 345–356.
- Jacobs, Janet Liebman (April 2004). "Women, Genocide, and Memory". Gender & Society. 18 (2): 223–238. doi:10.1177/0891243203261572. ISSN 0891-2432.

== Awards and professional activities ==
Janet Jacobs was awarded the 2017 Outstanding Book Award from the American Sociological Association Section on Peace, War and Social Conflict for her book The Holocaust Across Generations: Trauma and its Inheritance Among Descendants of Survivors. In 2016 Janet Jacobs presented a lecture to the International Conference on Women and War in Yerevan, Armenia entitled "Gender and the Intergenerational Transmission of Trauma: Family Narratives and the Construction of Identity Among Descendants of the Holocaust". Jacobs also presented a lecture entitled "Gender and Holocaust Memorialization" at the Conference in Jewish and Gender Studies in honor of Debra Kaufman at Northeastern University in 2012. In 2011 Jacobs presented the Stanley L. Saxton Address "Gender and Genocide: Collective Memory and Holocaust Memorials" at the University of Dayton.

Jacobs in 2010 presented the Keynote Paul Hanley Furfey Lecture for the Association for the Sociology of Religion entitled "Sacred Space and Collective Memory: Memorializing Genocide at Sites of Terror". Jacobs was awarded the Hazel Barnes Prize at the University of Colorado in 2005. She was also awarded the Distinguished Book Award in 2003 from the Society for the Scientific Study of Religion for her Book Hidden Heritage: The Legacy of the Crypto-Jews. In 2000 Jacobs was awarded the Gender Scholar Award from the Association for the Sociology of Religion. She gave the 2005 Commencement Address at the University of Colorado. In 2012, Jacobs received the Distinguished Career Award from the American Sociological Association's Children and Youth section.

=== Affiliations ===
Jacobs has served on the Awards Committee (2013–15); Nominating Committee (2004–10 and 1994–96); and on the Executive Council (1997–98) for the Society for the Scientific Study of Religion and was the Annual Meeting Program Chair in 1990. Jacobs served as the editor for NYU Press Qualitative Study of Religion series. Jacobs has also served as a Referee for the American Sociological Review; Gender and Society; Journal of Contemporary Ethnography; Journal for Research on Adolescence; Signs: Journal of Women and Society; Social Problems; Sociology of Religion and was both Referee and on the editorial board (2003–12) for the Journal for the Scientific Study of Religion. Jacobs has served as a Manuscript Consultant for the Columbia University Press; Oxford University Press; Duke University Press; University of Tennessee Press, University of California Press; and New York University Press. Professional Affiliations include the American Academy of Religion; American Sociological Association; Association for the Sociology of Religion; Society for the Scientific Study of Religion; and the International Visual Sociology Association.

== See also ==
- Crypto-Judaism
