= Ann C. Scales =

American lawyer

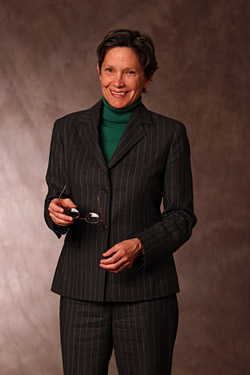
- Photo of Ann C. Scales
- Born: May 29, 1952; Shawnee, Oklahoma
- Died: June 24, 2012 (aged 60); Denver, Colorado
- Education: Wellesley College (BA); Harvard Law School (JD)
- Occupation: Attorney
- Known for: Feminist jurisprudence

Ann C. Scales (May 29, 1952 – June 24, 2012) was an American lawyer, activist, and law professor at the University of Denver Sturm College of Law from 2003 to 2012, where she taught in constitutional law, sexual orientation and the law, civil procedure and torts.

She was a founder of the legal field of feminist jurisprudence, and coined the term feminist jurisprudence in 1977.

== Biography ==
=== Early life and education ===
Ann Catherine Scales was born in Shawnee, Oklahoma. Her father James R. Scales was the president of Oklahoma Baptist University from 1961 to 1965. He went on to be president of Wake Forest University from 1968 to 1983. Her mother, Elizabeth Ann Randel Scales, had also been a professor and was very active in the Red Cross and in arranging events at these universities.

Scales received her B.A. from Wellesley College in history and philosophy in 1974 and her J.D. in 1978 from Harvard Law School, where she served on Harvard Legal Aid and the Harvard Women's Law Association. She was a member of the committee that put together "Celebration 25", a party and conference held in 1978 to celebrate the twenty-fifth anniversary of the first women graduating from Harvard Law School. This project eventually turned into the Harvard Women's Law Journal, currently the Harvard Journal of Law & Gender.

=== Career ===
Ann Scales taught at the University of New Mexico Law School for 18 years. She was a visiting professor at the University of Iowa College of Law, Boston College Law School, the University of British Columbia Faulty of Law, and the University of North Carolina at Chapel Hill. At the time of her death, she was a professor at the University of Denver's Sturm College of Law. Scales was among the founders of the field of feminist jurisprudence and invented the term feminist jurisprudence in 1977 while planning a panel for Celebration 25.

Throughout her career, Ann Scales practiced pro bono law in the fields of reproductive rights and LGBTQI rights. She argued the case in which the New Mexico Supreme Court became the first high court of any state to hold that abortion funding is required by women's interest in equality. She also worked on the University of Colorado football gang rape case; the effort to bring a women's marathon to the Olympics; and R. v. Butler, a pornography case in which Canada's Supreme Court redefined obscenity based on the standard of harm it inflicts, particularly to women.

Scales, a supporter of postmodernism and Critical legal studies, argued that objective reality was a myth constructed by the patriarchy.

Ann Scales was a former rodeo rider and was in part descended from Cherokee Native Americans. Some of her ancestors walked the Trail of Tears from North Carolina to Oklahoma.

She died on June 24, 2012, in a hospice in Denver, Colorado, as a result of massive brain trauma after a fall down the stairs in her home earlier in the month.

== Publications ==
=== Books ===
- Legal Feminism: Activism, Lawyering, and Legal Theory. NYU Press, 2006. ISBN 9780814798454

=== Journal articles ===
- "Student Gladiators and Sexual Assault: A New Analysis of Liability for Injuries Inflicted by College Athletes". Michigan Journal of Gender & Law Vol. 15, No. 205 (2008–2009). U Denver Legal Studies Research Paper No. 07-39.
- "Surviving Legal De-Education: An Outsider's Guide". Vermont Law Review, 1990.
- "Soft on Defense: The Failure to Confront Militarism". 20 Berkeley Journal of Gender, Law & Justice 369.
- "Law and Feminism: Together in Struggle". 51 University of Kansas Law Review 291 (February 2003).
- "The Jurisprudence of the Military-Industrial Complex". 1 Seattle Journal for Social Justice 541 (Spring/Summer 2003).
- "Toward A Feminist Jurisprudence". Indiana Law Journal, 1981.
- "Disappearing Medusa: The Fate of Feminist Legal Theory?". 20 Harvard Women's Law Journal 34 (Spring 1997).
- "Feminist Legal Method: Not So Scary". 2 UCLA Women's Law Journal 1 (Spring 1992).
- "Midnight Train to Us". Cornell Law Journal Page 710, Vol. 75. No. 3 (March 1990).
- "The Emergence of Feminist Jurisprudence: An Essay". 95 Yale Law Journal 1373–1403 (1986).
- "The Women's Peace Movement and Law: Feminist Jurisprudence as Oxymoron?". Volume 59, Issue 6, Faculty of Law, University of Toronto, 1988.
