= Robert W. Woodruff Professor =

Endowed professorship at Emory University

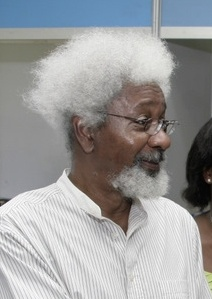
Wole Soyinka, the 1986 Nobel Prize in Literature laureate, was appointed as the Robert W. Woodruff Professor of the Arts in 1996

The Robert W. Woodruff Professorships are endowed professorships at Emory University, named for philanthropist Robert W. Woodruff. The chairs are Emory University's "most distinguished academic appointments [...] reserved for world-class scholars who are not only proven leaders of their own fields of specialty but also ambitious bridge-builders across specialty disciplines." There have been 24 Woodruff Professors appointed since the 1982.

== List of Robert W. Woodruff Professors ==
- William Arrowsmith (1924–1992), Robert W. Woodruff Professor Emeritus if Classics and Comparative Literature (appointed in 1982)
- Harold J. Berman (1918–2007), Robert W. Woodruff Professor Emeritus of Law (appointed in 1985)
- Don Browning, Robert W. Woodruff Visiting Professor of Interdisciplinary Studies (2003–2004)
- Deborah Bruner, Robert W. Woodruff Professor and Chair in Nursing (appointed in 2011)
- Michael Davis, Robert W. Woodruff Professor Emeritus of Psychiatry and Behavioral Sciences
- Richard Ellman (1918–1987), Robert W. Woodruff Professor Emeritus (appointed in 1982)
- David Eltis, Robert W. Woodruff Professor Emeritus in History (appointed in 2005)
- Shoshana Felman, Robert W. Woodruff Professor of Comparative Literature and French (appointed in 2004)
- Martha Fineman, Robert W. Woodruff Professor of Law (appointed in 2004)
- Peng Jin, Robert W. Woodruff Professor of Human Genetics (appointed in 2019)
- Luke Timothy Johnson, Robert W. Woodruff Professor of New Testament and Christian Origins
- Allan Levey, Robert W. Woodruff Professor of Neurology (appointed in 2021)
- Edward S. Mocarski, Robert W. Woodruff Professor Emeritus in Microbiology and Immunology (2006–2021)
- Reynaldo Martorell, Robert W. Woodruff Professor of International Nutrition
- Martin E. Marty, Robert W. Woodruff Visiting Professor of Interdisciplinary Studies at Emory University (2003–2004)
- Ian A. McFarland, Robert W. Woodruff Professor of Theology (appointed in 2019)
- Michael J. Perry, Robert W. Woodruff Professor of Law (appointed in 2003)
- Wole Soyinka, Robert W. Woodruff Professor of the Arts (appointed in September 1996)
- Vikas Sukhatme, Robert W. Woodruff Professor and Dean, Emory School of Medicine (appointed in 2017)
- Kenneth E. Thorpe, Robert W. Woodruff Professor of Health Policy (appointed in 1999)
- Archbishop Desmond Tutu, Robert W. Woodruff Visiting Professor of Theology (1998–2000)
- Natasha Trethewey, Robert W. Woodruff Professor of English and Creative Writing (departed role in 2017)
- John Witte Jr., Robert W. Woodruff Professor of Law (appointed in 2014)
- Anant Madabhushi, Robert W. Woodruff Professor of Biomedical Engineering (appointed in 2023)
