= Michael J. Perry =

American legal scholar

Michael J. Perry is an American legal scholar, specializing in constitutional law, human rights, and law and religion.

== Career ==
Perry was born (on December 6, 1945) and raised in Louisville, Kentucky. He did his undergraduate studies, majoring in philosophy and minoring in theology, at Georgetown University (A.B., 1968). He studied law at Columbia University School of Law (J.D., 1973). Perry then served as law clerk to U.S. District Judge Jack B. Weinstein (1973–74) and, a year later, to U.S. Circuit Judge Shirley M. Hufstedler (1974–75).

In 2003, Perry was appointed Robert W. Woodruff Professor at Emory University School of Law, the second legal scholar (after Harold J. Berman) to be appointed to a Woodruff chair. (In 2004, Martha Albertson Fineman was appointed to a Woodruff chair.) A Woodruff chair, which is a university chair, is the highest honor Emory University bestows on a member of its faculty. Perry is also a senior fellow at the Center for the Study of Law and Religion at Emory University School of Law.

Perry retired at the end of the 2022–23 academic year and is now Robert W. Woodruff Professor Emeritus at Emory University.

Before coming to Emory, Perry was the inaugural occupant of the Howard J. Trienens Chair in Law at Northwestern University School of Law (1990–97), where he taught for fifteen years (1982–97). He then held the University Distinguished Chair in Law at Wake Forest University School of Law (1997–2003). Perry began his teaching career at Ohio State University College of Law (1975–82) and has taught as a visiting professor at several law schools, including Yale Law School, Tulane University School of Law, New York Law School, University of Tokyo, Rikkyo University, Japan, University of Alabama School of Law, University of Western Ontario, Canada, and Sichuan University, China. For three consecutive fall semesters (2009, 2010, 2011), Perry was the University Distinguished Visiting Professor in Law and Peace Studies at the University of San Diego, where he taught both in the School of Law and in the Joan B. Kroc School of Peace Studies.

Perry is married to Sarah O'Leary, who before retirement was a public health specialist at the U.S. Centers for Disease Control (CDC). They have two sons: Daniel (b. 1989) and Gabriel (b. 1991).

== Books ==
Perry's books include

- The Constitution, the Courts, and Human Rights (Yale, 1982)
- Morality, Politics, and Law (Oxford, 1988)
- Love and Power: The Role of Religion and Morality in American Politics (Oxford, 1991)
- The Constitution in the Courts: Law or Politics? (Oxford, 1994)
- Religion in Politics: Constitutional and Moral Perspectives (Oxford, 1997)
- The Idea of Human Rights: Four Inquiries (Oxford, 1998)
- We the People: The Fourteenth Amendment and the Supreme Court (Oxford, 1999)
- Under God? Religious Faith and Liberal Democracy (Cambridge, 2003)
- Toward a Theory of Human Rights: Religion, Law, Courts (Cambridge, 2007)
- Constitutional Rights, Moral Controversy, and the Supreme Court (Cambridge, 2009)
- The Political Morality of Liberal Democracy (Cambridge, 2010)
- Human Rights in the Constitutional Law of the United States (Cambridge, 2013)
- A Global Political Morality: Human Rights, Democracy, and Constitutionalism (Cambridge 2017)
- Interrogating the Morality of Human Rights (Elgar Studies in Human Rights 2023)

== Awards and recognitions ==
In 1999, Perry was awarded an LL.D. (honoris causa) by St. John's University, Collegeville, Minnesota.

In January 2004, Perry was named "Distinguished Columbian in Law Teaching" by the Columbia University School of Law. The award is bestowed annually on a graduate of Columbia Law.

In March 2004, a symposium of some 500 scholars and students gathered at Emory University School of Law to celebrate the scholarship of its three Robert W. Woodruff Professors of Law, Harold J. Berman, Martha Albertson Fineman, and Michael J. Perry, and of Visiting Professor Martin E. Marty.

In 2022, the Emory Law Journal published a Festschrift celebrating Perry's scholarly career: Emory Law Journal, Volume 71, Number 7 (2022). Twelve scholars contributed essays to the Festschrift. Three more scholars who prepared essays for the Festschrift published the essays elsewhere: The Journal of Contemporary Legal Issues, Volume 23, Number 2 (2022).
