= Dorothea S. Clarke Professor of Feminist Jurisprudence =

Feminist jurisprudence at Cornell Law School

The Dorothea S. Clarke Professorship of Feminist Jurisprudence was founded at Cornell Law School in 1997, and is the first endowed chair in feminist jurisprudence at a law school in the United States. The professorship is one of three named professorships at Cornell endowed by Exxon executive Jack G. Clarke and Dorothea S. Clarke. The professorship is intended for "a law professor who has achieved distinction in a field related to women and the law, such as civil rights, family law, and feminist jurisprudence." The first holder of the chair, Martha Fineman, took office in 1999.

The professorship has been held by

- Martha Fineman 1999–2004
- Cynthia Grant Bowman 2007–

The other professorships endowed by Jack G. Clarke and Dorothea S. Clarke are the Jack G. Clarke Professor of Far East Legal Studies and the Jack G. Clarke Professor of International and Comparative Law.
