= Kenneth E. Thorpe =

American administrator

Kenneth E. Thorpe is the Robert W. Woodruff Professor of Health Policy at Emory University, the Chair of the Department of Health Policy and Management in the Rollins School of Public Health, and a former Deputy Assistant Secretary at the Department of Health and Human Services (1993–1995). He is also the Executive Director of the Partnership to Fight Chronic Disease and the Emory Institute for Advanced Policy Solutions.

Appointed as Deputy Assistant Secretary in President Bill Clinton's cabinet, he had a central role in coordinating President Clinton's health care reform proposals.
