= Feminist legal theory =

Legal theory

Feminist legal theory, also known as feminist jurisprudence, is a field of legal scholarship and activism that analyzes how law contributes to women's subordination and patriarchal power structures. The project of feminist legal theory is twofold. First, feminist jurisprudence seeks to explain how the law plays a role in maintaining women's subordinate status. Feminist legal theory recognizes that the legal system was built primarily by and for patriarchal intentions, often forgetting important experiences women, girls, and marginalized communities face.

Second, feminist legal theory is dedicated to changing women's status through a rework of the law and its approach to gender. It is a critique of American law that was created to change the way women were treated and how judges had applied the law to keep women in the same position they had been in for years. The women who worked in this area studied the law's function in holding women in a lower place in society than men based on gender assumptions (which judges have relied on to make their decisions). This movement originated in the 1960s and 1970s to achieve equality for women by challenging laws that made distinctions based on sex. One example of this sex-based discrimination during these times was the struggles for equal admission and access to their desired education. The women's experiences and persistence to fight for equal access led to low rates of retention and mental health issues, including anxiety disorders. Through their experiences, they were influenced to create new legal theory that fought for their rights and those that came after them in education and broader marginalized communities which led to the creation of the legal scholarship feminist legal theory in the 1970s and 1980s. It was crucial to allowing women to become their own people through becoming financially independent and having the ability to find real jobs that were not available to them before due to discrimination in employment. The foundation of feminist legal theory reflects these second and third-wave feminist struggles. However, feminist legal theorists today extend their work beyond overt discrimination by employing a variety of approaches to understand and address how the law contributes to gender inequality.

== History ==
The first known use of the term feminist jurisprudence was in the late 1970s by Ann Scales during the planning process for Celebration 25, a party and conference held in 1978 to celebrate the twenty-fifth anniversary of the first women graduating from Harvard Law School. The term was first published in 1978 in the first issue of the Harvard Women's Law Journal. This feminist critique of American law was developed as a reaction to the fact that the legal system was too gender-prioritized and patriarchal.

In 1984 Martha Fineman founded the Feminism and Legal Theory Project at the University of Wisconsin Law School to explore the relationships between feminist theory, practice, and law, which has been instrumental in the development of feminist legal theory.

The foundation of the feminist legal theory was laid by women who challenged the laws that were in place to keep women in their respective places in the home. A driving force of this new movement was the need for women to start becoming financially independent.

Women who were working in law started to focus on this idea more and started to work on achieving reproductive freedom, stopping gender discrimination in the law and workforce, and stopping the allowance of sexual abuse.

== Main approaches ==
Some approaches to feminist jurisprudence are:

- the liberal equality model;
- the sexual difference model;
- the dominance model;
- the anti-essentialist model;
- and the postmodern model.

Each model provides a distinct view of the legal mechanisms that contribute to women's subordination, and each offers a distinct method for changing legal approaches to gender.

=== The liberal equality model ===
The liberal equality model operates from within the liberal legal paradigm and generally embraces liberal values and the rights-based approach to law, though it takes issue with how the liberal framework has operated in practice. This model focuses on ensuring that women are afforded genuine equality including race, sexual orientation, and gender—as opposed to the nominal equality often given them in the traditional liberal framework—and seeks to achieve this either by way of a more thorough application of liberal values to women's experiences or the revision of liberal categories to take gender into account. The liberal equality model applies Kimberlé Crenshaw's theoretical framework of intersectionality in relation to a person's lived experience. For example, when black women are only provided legal relief when the case is against their race or gender.

=== The sexual difference model ===
The difference model emphasizes the significance of gender discrimination and holds that this discrimination should not be obscured by the law, but should be taken into account by it. Only by taking into account differences can the law provide adequate remedies for women's situation, which is in fact distinct from men's. The difference model suggests that differences between women and men put one sex at a disadvantage; therefore, the law should compensate women and men for their differences and disadvantages. These differences between women and men may be biological or culturally constructed. The difference model is in direct opposition to the sameness account which holds that women's sameness with men should be emphasized. To the sameness feminist, employing women's differences in an attempt to garner greater rights is ineffectual to that end and places emphasis on the very characteristics of women that have historically precluded them from achieving equality with men.

The sameness feminist also argued that there was already special treatment for these so-called "differences" in the law, which is what was oppressing women. The idea of there being differences between the sexes led to the classical thought that feminist legal theory was trying to get rid of. It forced women to prove that they were like men by comparing their experiences to those of men, all in an attempt to gain legal protection. This all only led to women trying to meet norms that were made by men without questioning why these were accepted as the norm for equality.

Men and women cannot be seen or defined as equal because they have completely different lived experiences. Understanding that access must be equal, but difference must still be recognized to diffract fairness and power struggle including unpaid societal standards like caring for children and the home, rather than feminine characteristics.

=== The dominance model ===
The dominance model rejects liberal feminism and views the legal system as a mechanism for the perpetuation of male dominance. By recognizing the foundation of law, scholars are able to conceptualize how women and marginalized communities were not written into the foundation of many structures limiting access and equal rights in all areas of life. Further, dominance theorists reject the difference model because it uses men as the benchmark of equality. While the liberal equality model and difference theory aim to achieve equality for women and men, the dominance model's end goal is to liberate women from men. Dominance theorists understand gender inequality as a result of an imbalance of power between women and men and believe the law contributes to this subordination of women. It thus joins certain strands of critical legal theory, which also consider the potential for law to act as an instrument for domination. This theory focuses on how male dominate females, but it also talks about other groups being oppressed such as how legal aid is not often offered to the transgender population. Also, any white female would have good legal representation compared to minority groups.

In the account of dominance proposed by Catharine MacKinnon, sexuality is central to dominance. MacKinnon argues that women's sexuality is socially constructed by male dominance and the sexual domination of women by men is a primary source of the general social subordination of women. According to MacKinnon, the legal system perpetuates inequalities between women and men by creating laws about women using a male perspective.

Additionally, MacKinnon further applies her dominance model of feminist legal theory to transgender sex equality. She criticizes the libertarian Textual and Literal Approach for exacerbating, rather than eliminating, the discrimination faced by lesbians, gay men, and transgender men and women. MacKinnon argues that the liberal Anti-Stereotyping Approach benefits only those who do not conform to stereotypes and yet meet the dominant standards while offering no help to those who face discrimination based on subordinated stereotypes. She asserts that only by adopting the Substantive Approach, inspired by her dominance model and focusing on the gender hierarchy driven by sexualized misogyny, can intersectionality be properly addressed, ultimately benefiting all women.

=== The anti-essentialist model ===
Anti-essentialist feminist legal theory was created by women of color and lesbians in the 1980s who felt feminist legal theory was excluding their perspectives and experiences. Anti-essentialist and intersectionalist critiques of feminists have objected to the idea that there can be any universal women's voice and have criticized feminists, as did Black feminism, for implicitly basing their work on the experiences of white, middle class, heterosexual women. The anti-essentialist and intersectionalist project has been to explore the ways in which race, class, sexual orientation, and other axes of subordination interplay with gender and to uncover the implicit, detrimental assumptions that have often been employed in feminist theory. This model challenges feminist legal theorists who only address how the law affects heterosexual, middle-class white women. Anti-essentialist feminist legal theory recognizes that the identities of individual women shape their experiences, so the law does not influence all women in the same ways. It is about building actual equality for all regardless or gender, race, sexual orientation, class, or disability.

When feminist legal theory practices under an essentialist lens, women of color are often dismissed as they would in historical legal theory. While race is an important factor in feminist legal theory, it can also be misconstrued in a way that silences women of color, furthering racism in a system created to build more access. For this reason, Crenshaw's "Mapping the Margins: Intersectionality, Identity Politics, and Violence against Women of Color" should remain a canonical to this topic to continue to support and challenge the gender essentialism within feminism culture and ideology the marginalized women of color by protection them further in legal implications through support. Kimberlé Crenshaw's formation of intersectionality within feminist legal theory has given more women and people living multifaceted lives more representation in an arguable essentialist legal arena.

Mari Matsuda created the term "multiple consciousness" to explain a person's ability to take on the perspective of an oppressed group. Anti-essentialist feminist legal theorists use multiple consciousness to understand how the law is affecting women belonging to groups other than their own. Feminist legal theory is still evolving to diminish gender and race essentialism to recognize how oppression and privilege work together to create a person's life experiences.

=== The postmodern model ===
Postmodern feminist legal theorists reject the liberal equality idea that women are like men as well as the difference theory idea that women are inherently different from men. This is because they do not believe in singular truths and instead see truths as multiple and based on experience and perspective. Feminists from the postmodern camp use a method known as deconstruction in which they look at laws to find hidden biases within them. Postmodern feminists use deconstruction to demonstrate that laws should not be unchangeable since they are created by people with biases and may therefore contribute to female oppression. More recent scholarship has focused on sex/gender as manipulable tools of state policy, showing that state definitions of male and female often depend on the use of the category in furthering particular state projects.

== Hedonic Jurisprudence ==
Feminist legal theory produced a new idea of using hedonic jurisprudence to show that women's experiences of assault and rape was a product of laws that treated them as less human and gave them fewer rights than men. With this feminist legal theorists argued that given examples were not only a description of possible scenarios but also a sign of events that have actually occurred, relying on them to support statements that the law ignores the interests and disrespects the existence of women.

== Influence on judicial decisions ==
Over half of cases involving feminist issues in the Supreme Court of the United Kingdom included elements of feminist jurisprudence in their judgements. The most common form of feminist legal reasoning was placing the case within a wider context of the experience of those involved or another wider context, which could involve showing empathy for women involved in cases. Judges also considered the impact of judgments on disadvantaged groups, challenged gendered bias, and commented on historic injustice. Some feminist facts entered into the courts reasoning as common knowledge with feminist scholars being referred to. Lady Hale has used Intersectional arguments,arguments that extend the concept of violence in cases that domestic violence outside of physical violence.

== Notable scholars ==
- Paisley Currah
- Martha Fineman
- Mary Joe Frug
- Catharine MacKinnon
- Mari Matsuda
- Kimberlé Crenshaw
- Dean Spade
- Ann Scales
- Robin West

== See also ==
- Critical race theory
- Feminist political theory
- Gender mainstreaming
- Women in law
- Feminist interventions in the philosophy of law
