= James R. Scales =

American educator (1919–1996)

- Born: May 27, 1919; Delaware County, Oklahoma, U.S.
- Died: March 12, 1996 (aged 76)
- Employers: Oklahoma Baptist University; Oklahoma State University; Wake Forest University

Academic background
- Education: Oklahoma Baptist University
- Military career
- Allegiance: United States
- Branch: Navy
- Service years: 1942-1945

James Ralph Scales (May 27, 1919 – March 12, 1996) was president of Oklahoma Baptist University (his alma mater), 1961–1965, and eleventh president of Wake Forest University, from 1968-1983. He was a member of the Cherokee Nation and was active throughout his life in Cherokee affairs.

== Background and career ==
Scales was born in Delaware County, Oklahoma, to John Grover Scales, Sr. and Katie Scales. His father was born in 1889 in Spavinaw Creek, Indian Territory and was a Baptist pastor until his death in 1971. His parents had two sons, James Ralph and John Grover, Jr.

Scales began his career in education after graduating with his undergraduate and master's degrees from Oklahoma Baptist University in 1939 and 1941. Scales then served in the U.S. Navy from 1942 to 1945 during World War II, earning medals of honor and distinction for his service. Scales then followed his career in higher education as an associate professor and professor, from 1947 to 1961. He moved to college administration in 1950, moving to vice president (1950-1953), executive vice president (1953-1961), and president (1961-1965). In 1965, Scales became dean of the College of the Arts and Sciences and a professor of political science at Oklahoma State University. While living in Oklahoma, Scales was active in Democratic Party politics, serving as an alternate for the 1956 Democratic National Convention. In 1967, Scales became the eleventh president of Wake Forest University. During his time at Wake Forest, Scales oversaw an increased undergraduate enrollment and an expanded academic curriculum. He also was involved in lessening the university's ties to the Baptist State Convention of North Carolina. He was responsible for a fine arts center building project, later named the James R. Scales Fine Arts Center, and the acquisition of Worrell House in London, England, and Casa Artom in Venice, Italy. Scales resigned from the Office of the President in 1983.

His wife, Elizabeth Ann (Randel) Scales was born in Osage County, Oklahoma. Known as Betty Ann, she earned a B.A. degree from Oklahoma Baptist University in 1939. Betty Ann helped lead various college, social, and Baptist organizations while raising two daughters, Ann Catherine, a notable lawyer who coined the term "feminist jurisprudence," and Laura Elizabeth Scales, who died at age 20 in 1969. Betty Ann died on August 11, 1992.
