= Debra Kaufman =

American-Jewish sociologist

Debra Renee Kaufman (born April 2, 1941) is an American sociologist whose work focuses on feminist methodologies in the fields of the sociology of Jewry and Jewish history. Kaufman was the founder and former director of the Women’s Studies (later Women’s, Gender, and Sexuality Studies) and Jewish Studies programs at Northeastern University.

== Background ==
Born Debra Renee Horowitz, and raised in Cleveland, Ohio in a poor immigrant Jewish community, she married her husband, Michael Kaufman, who would become a professor of English and American Literature. Debra Kaufman studied at the University of Michigan, earning her undergraduate and master's degrees. In 1975, Debra Kaufman received her PhD from Cornell University.

Kaufman served as an editor for several journals, including Nashim: A Multidisciplinary Journal of Jewish Women’s Studies and Gender Issues and Contemporary Jewry.

=== Awards ===
- Marshall Sklare Award of the Association for the Social Scientific Study of Jewry (ASSJ)

== Select publications ==
=== Books ===
- Achievement and Women: Challenging the Assumptions (with Barbara Richardson) (1981)
- Rachel’s Daughters: Newly Orthodox Jewish Women (1991)

=== Chapters ===
- Kaufman, D. R. (2005). The place of Judaism in American Jewish identity. In Cambridge companion to American Judaism (pp. 169–186).
- Kaufman, D. R. (2019). Paradoxical politics: Gender politics among newly orthodox Jewish women in the United States. In Identity Politics and Women (pp. 349–366). Routledge.

=== Journal articles ===
- Kaufman, D. R. (1978). Associational ties in academe: Some male and female differences. Sex Roles, 4, 9-21.
- Kaufman, D. R. (1985). Women who return to Orthodox Judaism: A feminist analysis. Journal of Marriage and the Family, 543–551.
- Baruch, G., & Kaufman, D. R. (1987). Interpreting the data: women, developmental research and the media. Journal of Thought, 53–57.
- Kaufman, D. R. (1989). Patriarchal women: A case study of newly orthodox Jewish women. Symbolic Interaction, 12(2), 299–314.
- Kaufman, D. R. (1993). My mother’s daughter my daughter’s mother: Intergenerational conflicts and decision making among newly orthodox Jewish women. Family Perspective 26(4): 461–476.
- Kaufman, D. R. (1996). The holocaust and sociological inquiry: A feminist analysis. Contemporary Jewry 17: 6–17.
- Kaufman, D. R. (1996). Rethinking, reflecting, rewriting: Teaching feminist methodology. The Review of Education/Pedagogy/Cultural Studies, 18(2), 165–174.
- Kaufman, D. R. (1999). Embedded categories: Identity among Jewish young adults in the US. Race, Gender & Class, 76–87.
- Kaufman, D. R. (2001). Renaming violence. American Behavioral Scientist, 45(4), 654–667.
- Kaufman, D. R. (2010). The circularity of secularity: The sacred and the secular in some contemporary post-holocaust identity narratives. Contemporary Jewry 30: 119–139.
- Kaufman, D. R. (2014). Demographers on demography: The place of narrative in Jewish identity research, Contemporary Jewry 34, Guest Editor.
- Kaufman, D. R. (2014). Demographic storytelling: The importance of being narrative. Contemporary Jewry 34: 61–73.
- Kaufman, D. R. (2017). Narrating Jewish identity: A response to bruce phillips. Contemporary Jewry 37: 399–403.
- Kaufman, D. R. (2022). Studying the World with us in it. Contemporary Jewry 42: 233–236.
