= James R Scales Fine Arts Center =

Art school at Wake Forest University

The Scales Fine Arts Center is home to Wake Forest University's performing and visual arts departments.

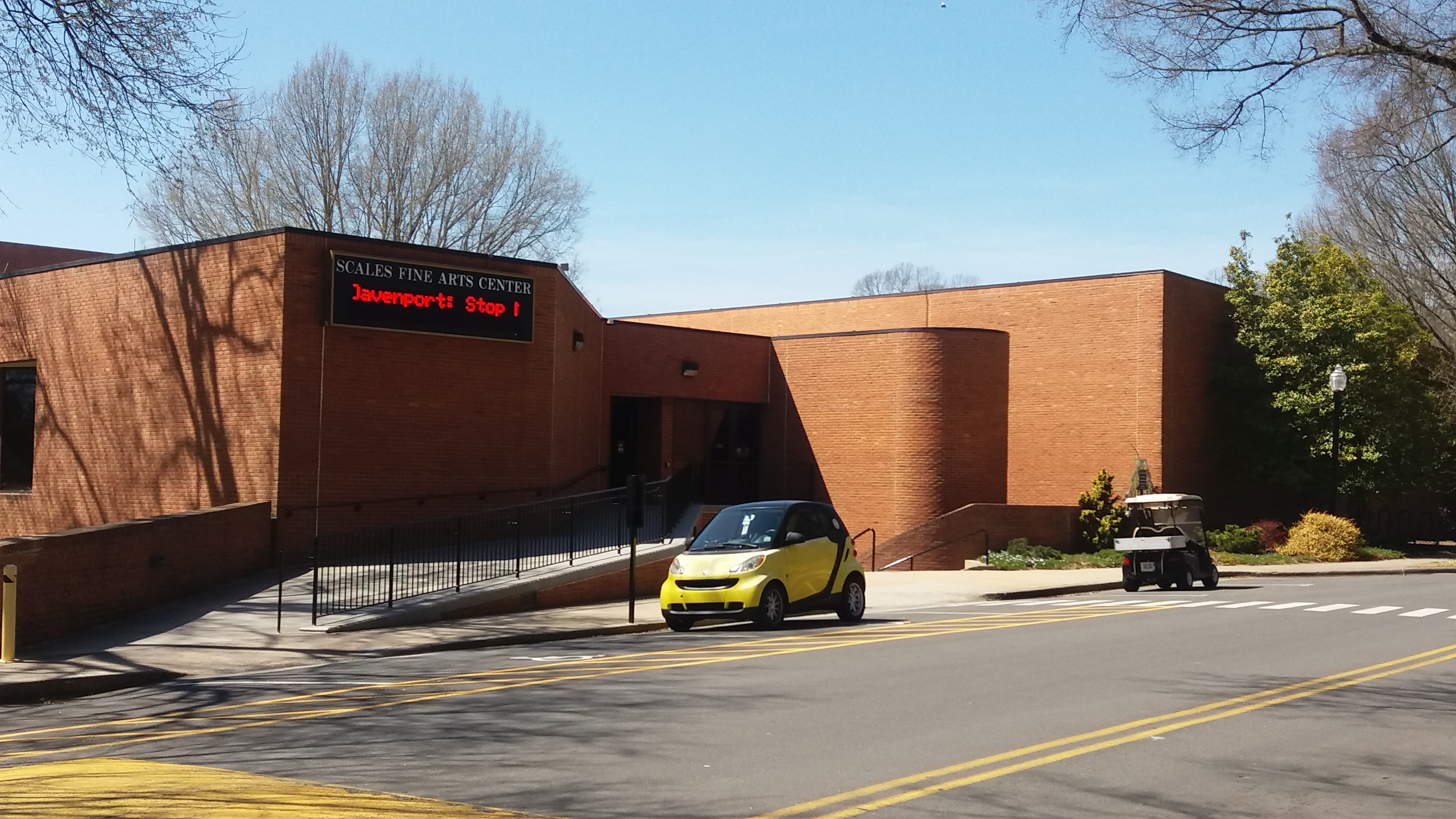
James R Scales Fine Arts Center at Wake Forest University

Named in 1979 in honor of James Ralph Scales, the 11th President of Wake Forest, the facility consists of two sections that are now referred to as Lower and Upper Scales but was once described as "one great hallelujah." Lower Scales houses the theatre, dance, and art departments while Upper Scales is home to the music department.

Dedicated as "The Fine Arts Center" in 1976, the lower wing houses the Harold C. Tedford Main Stage Theatre, the Ring Theatre (a theatre-in-the-round), the Eleanor Layfield Davis Painting Studio, and the Mary Duke Biddle Greenroom. Also located in the lower wing is the Hanes Art Gallery, named for Charlotte and Phillip Hanes, and an arts slide library dedicated to Andrew Lewis Aycock, retired Professor of English, who made the collection possible.

The music wing, dedicated in 1982, houses Brendle Recital Hall, a 630-seat performance space named for James David Brendle. A dedicated space for student performances, Brendle Hall is also the home of the Secrest Artists Series as well as hosting visiting speakers and the Lilting Banshees Comedy Troupe.
