= Vulnerability and the Human Condition Initiative =

- Formation: 2008
- Purpose: Study and debate models of state support and legal protection that focus on the commonalities of the human condition
- Director: Martha Albertson Fineman
- Parent organization: Emory University School of Law (2008–)
- Website: Official site

In 2008, Martha Albertson Fineman established ‘The Vulnerability and the Human Condition Initiative’ (VHC) as an interdisciplinary theme of Emory University’s Laney Graduate School. The Initiative was initially supported by joint contributions from Emory's Race and Difference Initiative and the Feminism and Legal Theory Project (which Fineman established in 1984 while at the University of Wisconsin). The VHC initiative first public session took the form of a roundtable discussion with Bryan S. Turner and Peadar Kirby (both of whom were already working on concepts of vulnerability in relation to a sociology of human rights and a critical account of globalisation respectively). It was at this event that Fineman distributed her 2008 paper, ‘The Vulnerable Subject’ for early discussion. Various workshops, programs and publications have followed. Vulnerability: Reflections on a New Ethical Foundation for Law and Politics includes chapters by many workshop participants situating vulnerability in various philosophical traditions, on topics ranging from assisted reproductive technology, animals and economics.

The Initiative draws on the resources of many academic disciplines at Emory, from law to psychiatry to women's studies to environmental science, and also hosts visiting scholars from around the world each year, whose biographies can be found on the Initiative's website. The full Initiative website lists upcoming events, and publishes available resources for parties interested in learning more about vulnerability. Of particular interest to scholars and researchers may be visiting scholar interviews, information on the VHC's global affiliated faculty, and profiles on the VHC's Emory affiliated faculty. Information on news, events, workshops, and seminars is also available on the full website.

== Definitions ==
=== Vulnerability ===
Vulnerability is a universal aspect of the human condition, arising from our embodiment and our location within society and its institutions. On the individual level, vulnerability refers to the ever-present possibility of harm, injury or biological impairment or limitation. As human creations, institutions also are vulnerable to capture, cooptation and corruption. Vulnerability also is generative and presents opportunities for innovation and growth, creativity and fulfillment. As embodied and vulnerable beings, we experience feelings such as love, respect, curiosity, amusement and desire that make us reach out to others, form relationships and build institutions.

=== The Vulnerable Subject ===
The Vulnerable Subject is a reconceptualized legal entity that is meant to replace the autonomous and independent liberal subject. When placed at the center of political and social endeavors, the Vulnerable Subject expands current ideas of state responsibility. It refocuses the relationship between the state and individuals upon the universal need for resilience, thereby legitimating claims calling for state responsibility to ensure meaningful access and opportunity to its institutions.

=== Resilience ===
Resilience is a highly relational concept, emphasizing the importance of understanding individuals within institutions and in interaction with each other. The state and the societal institutions it brings into existence through law collectively play an important role in creating opportunities and options for addressing human vulnerability. Together and independently institutional systems, such as those of education, finance, and health, provide resources or assets that give individuals resilience in the face of our shared vulnerability. Assets or resources may take five forms: physical, human, social, ecological or environmental and existential. A responsive state, must ensure that its institutions provide meaningful access and opportunity to accumulate resources and that some individuals or groups of individuals are not unduly privileged, while others are disadvantaged.

=== The State ===
A governing body. The manifestation of public authority and the ultimate legitimate repository of coercive power. Most readily visible through "branches" of government and in realms referred to as "public". The state also becomes manifest through complex institutional arrangements creating legal entities that operate in traditionally "private" realms. These include the family, domestic arrangements and the workplace.

=== Equality ===
Legal equality in the United States tends to focus on formal and procedural processes, and not on more substantive or outcome-sensitive measures of equality. Many programs focus on target groups, rather than provide universal benefits. The Vulnerability and the Human Condition Initiative is interested in finding ways to ensure meaningful and universal equality of access and opportunity that specifically takes into account the state's responsibility to address existing entrenched privilege and disadvantage, not just prohibited forms of discrimination.

== 2020 ==
A Workshop on Vulnerability and Corporate Subjectivity. This workshop has been rescheduled to Friday, October 2, 2020- Saturday, October 3, 2020.

Commemorating Scholarly Milestones: The Legacy of The Neutered Mother at Twenty-Five Years March 6–7, 2020

== 2019 ==
A Workshop on the Clash of Values: Paternalism versus Liberalism January 25–26, 2019

A Workshop on Universal Vulnerability and the Politics of Public Health: Challenging the 'Categories' of Age and Disability University of Lund, Sweden, September 19–20, 2019

A Workshop on Vulnerability and the Organisation of Academic Labour Nottingham Trent University, England, October 25–26, 2019

== 2018 ==
A Workshop on Autonomy and Vulnerability February 23–24, 2018

View workshop Call for Papers as a PDF A Conference on Vulnerability and the Social Reproduction of Resilient Societies May 29–31, 2018

Law and Society Association | Two Roundtable Sessions: Reflections on Vulnerability Theory- Retrospective and Prospective June 7–10, 2018 | Toronto, Canada

A Workshop on Vulnerability Theory and the Human Condition: Celebrating a Decade of Innovation September 20–21, 2018 | University of Leeds School of Law, UK

=== 2017 ===
A Workshop on the Environment and Vulnerability: The Anthropocene in the Time of Trump, April 14–15, Atlanta, GA

Subjects and Objects of Law: A Workshop on Animals and Vulnerability, May 31, Leeds, United Kingdom

A Workshop on Property, Vulnerability, and Resilience, September 22–23, Colchester, United Kingdom (University of Essex Colchester campus)

A Workshop on Professionalism and Vulnerability, October 27–28, Leeds, United Kingdom

A Workshop on Legal Transitions and the Vulnerable Subject: Fostering Resilience through Law's Dynamism, December 8–9, Atlanta, GA

=== 2016 ===
A Workshop on the Environment and Vulnerability, April 8–9, Northampton, MA

A Workshop on Reproductive and Sexual Justice, April 29–30, Boston, MA

A Workshop on Vulnerability and Social Justice, June 17–18, Leeds, UK

Sex, Violence and Vulnerability: An Uncomfortable Conversation, November 4–5, Atlanta, GA

A Workshop on Legal Migrations, Vulnerability, and Resilience, December 9–10, Atlanta, GA

=== 2015 ===
A Workshop on Vulnerability and Education, April 24–25, Amherst, MA

Vulnerability at the Intersection of the Changing Firm and the Changing Family, October 16–17, Atlanta, GA

A Workshop on Children, Vulnerability and Resilience, December 11–12, Atlanta, GA

=== 2014 ===
Vulnerability, Resilience, and Public Responsibility for Social and Economic Wellbeing, June 13–14, Buffalo, NY
An Uncomfortable Conversation: The Universal and the Particular: Vulnerability and Identities II, November 14–15, Miami, FL
A Workshop on Theorizing the State: Resources of Vulnerability, December 5–6, Atlanta, GA

=== 2013 ===
Work and Vulnerability, April 5–6, Atlanta, GA
Privatization, Globalization and Social Responsibility, June 14–15, Lund, Sweden

=== 2012 ===
Sexuality and Justice
Corporate Rights vs Children's Interest
An Uncomfortable Conversations: Vulnerability and Identities
Vulnerability in the 21st Century Student Legal Scholarship
An Uncomfortable Conversation: Human Use of Animals

=== 2011 ===
Structuring Resilience Beyond Rights: Vulnerability and Justice
Masking and Manipulating Vulnerability
Aging as a Feminist Concern
