= Reynaldo Martorell =

American nutrition scientist

Reynaldo Martorell is a Honduran-born American nutrition scientist and the Robert W. Woodruff Professor of International Nutrition Emeritus at the Rollins School of Public Health of Emory University. His research has focused on maternal and child nutrition, child growth and development, micronutrient malnutrition, obesity in developing countries, and the evaluation of nutrition programmes.

== Education ==
Martorell received a bachelor's degree in anthropology from Saint Louis University and a PhD in biological anthropology from the University of Washington.

== Career ==
Martorell began his career as a scientist at the Institute of Nutrition of Central America and Panama in Guatemala. He later held faculty positions at Stanford University and Cornell University before joining Emory University. At Emory, he served as chair of the Hubert Department of Global Health at the Rollins School of Public Health from 1997 to 2009.

He has served as an advisor or consultant to international health and development organisations, including UNICEF, the World Health Organization, the World Bank, and other agencies working in nutrition and public health.

== Research ==
Martorell's work has examined the long-term effects of early-life nutrition on growth, adult health, human capital, and productivity. A 2013 profile in The Lancet described him as a leading figure in maternal and child nutrition and noted his work on longitudinal cohort studies in Guatemala.

He has also studied the effects of childhood nutrition and famine exposure on adult outcomes, including work on the long-term effects of the 1959–1961 Chinese famine.

== Awards and recognition ==
Martorell was elected to the Institute of Medicine, now the National Academy of Medicine. His honours include the McCollum International Lectureship, the International Nutrition Prize, the Carlos Slim Award for Lifetime Achievements in Research on Health, the Gopalan Oration and Gold Medal Award from the Nutrition Society of India, and the Raymond Pearl Award from the Human Biology Association.
