= Cynthia Grant Bowman =

American lawyer

Cynthia Grant Bowman is an American legal scholar specializing in areas relating to law and women, including women in the legal profession, sexual harassment, and legal remedies for adult survivors of childhood sex abuse. She is the Dorothea S. Clarke Professor of Feminist Jurisprudence at Cornell Law School (appointed in 2007).

She holds a PhD in Political Science from Columbia University and a JD from Northwestern University. Bowman was a Professor of Law and of Gender Studies at Northwestern University before joining Cornell Law School.
