= Sapna Cheryan =

American social psychologist

- Born: 1977 (age 48–49) (Note: In 2008, Cheryan was reported to be 30); Urbana, Illinois, USA
- Spouse: Giridhar Shivaram (m. 2008)
- Relatives: Munir Cheryan (father)

Academic background
- Education: B.A., Psychology & American Studies, 1999, Northwestern University; PhD, 2007, Stanford University
- Thesis: Strategies of belonging: defending threatened identities (2007)

Academic work
- Institutions: University of Washington

Sapna Cheryan (born 1978) is an American social psychologist. She is a Full professor of social psychology in the Department of Psychology at the University of Washington.

== Early life and education ==
Cheryan was born to financial aid administrator mother Leela Cheryan and research professor father Munir Cheryan in Chicago, Illinois. Growing up, she became interested in topics revolving around race, gender, and equality. She earned her Bachelor of Arts degree in Psychology and American Studies before enrolling at Stanford University for her PhD. As a graduate student, she began to notice that the atmosphere of working or learning environments could directly influence ones choice to join the field. This led her to develop her thesis titled Strategies of belonging: defending threatened identities.

After graduating from Stanford, Cheryan married Giri Shivaram in 2008. Giri Shivaram is an interventional radiologist at Seattle Children’s Hospital.

== Career ==
Upon earning her PhD, Cheryan immediately joined the faculty of Psychology at the University of Washington (UW) with a specific focus on gendered stereotypes and prejudices. She co-founded UW's Debunking Stereotypes Workshop with students Amanda Tose, Marissa Vichayapai, and Lauren Hudson to encourage more women to join Science, technology, engineering, and mathematics (STEM) fields. Cheryan also led a research project that used statistics from the National Science Foundation (NSF) to prove that negative stereotypes of computer scientists could result in less women joining the field. As a result of her research, she received the 2009 NSF's Junior Faculty Career Award for "outstanding research, excellent education and the integration of education and research within the context of the mission of their organizations." She also earned the 2011 American Association of University Women Named Honoree for her efforts to achieve equity for women in science-based fields.

During the 2012–13 academic year, Cheryan conducted three studies in New York as a Russell Sage Foundation fellow. The research project focused on the effects anti-American stereotypes had on immigrant groups in America. She also studied the negative effects that geeky male nerd stereotypes portrayed in the media had on women joining STEM fields. Cheryan and her research colleagues conducted two studies on the female undergraduate populations attending UW and Stanford University; firstly asking them to describe computer science majors and secondly asking them to read a fabricated newspaper article. At the conclusion of the study, Cheryan concluded that women were more likely than men to be influenced by negative stereotypes surrounding STEM fields. The following year, Cheryan was invited to the White House by former President Barack Obama after it was decided to create a "computer science classroom design prize" in her honor.

In 2015, Cheryan continued her research into stereotypes by returning to Stanford to conduct another study, this time focusing on males' perceived masculinity. She used falsified data to infer to her male participants, who were squeezing a handheld device, that they were on average or weaker than their female counterparts. She followed up her experiment by asking health and body-related questions, during which she noticed men often exaggerated their height to seem more masculine. Upon realizing this, she conducted a second male-focused group study where students would answer a masculinity test with multiple-choice questions about consumer preferences and personal attributes. Those who scored lower on the test, although all results were randomized, felt the need to overcompensate by choosing more male consumer products as compensation for their time. She also led a female-focused study where she asked undergraduate students to interact with male and female actors who pretended to be computer science majors. Half of the participants interacted with actors who fit the nerdy, geeky computer scientist stereotypes who claimed to enjoy solitary hobbies, while the others interacted with actors dressed and acting like "typical college students." The results of the study fount that women were more influenced by stereotypes in computer science than gender.

During the 2016–17-year, Cheryan continued to conduct various studies on how stereotypes directly divert young girls for pursuing a career in STEM. Cheryan and her colleagues found that the culture of STEM and lack of encouragement for women to focus on math and science were the main causes of the gender gap in STEM fields. She also led a study titled Gay Asian Americans Are Seen as More American Than Asian Americans Who Are Presumed Straight, which found that American perceived homosexual Asian Americans to be more likely to speak fluent English than those whose sexual identity was not specified. Cheryan also received a visiting fellowship position in communications at the Center for Advanced Study in the Behavioral Sciences at Stanford University during the academic year.

As a result of her research on gender, STEM, and female stereotypes, Cheryan was approached by Mattel in the spring of 2018 to advise on their latest Barbie dolls. She was appointed to their 12 person Barbie Global Advisory Council to "help inform and refine Barbie brand initiatives." During the summer of 2019, Cheryan was promoted from Associate professor to Full professor of social psychology in the Department of Psychology.
