= Niamh Reilly =

Irish political scientist

Academic work
- Discipline: Political science, sociology
- Institutions: NUI Galway

Niamh Reilly is an Irish political scientist. She is Established Professor of Political Science and Sociology at the National University of Ireland, Galway. She has worked with the United Nations on women's rights issues and the Irish government's Standing Committee on Human Rights. In 2007 she joined the National University of Ireland, Galway, where she is Established Professor, the Irish equivalent of a distinguished professorship.

== Books ==
- International Human Rights of Women, Springer, 2019 (edited)
- Religion, Gender and the Public Sphere, Routledge, 2014 (edited)
- Women's Human Rights: Seeking Gender Justice in a Globalizing Age, Polity Press, 2009
- Demanding Accountability: The Global Campaign and Vienna Tribunal for Women's Human Rights, with Charlotte Bunch, UNIFEM, 1994
