= Evangelia Tastsoglou =

Greek-Canadian sociologist and lawyer

- Born: 1958 (age 67–68); Piraeus, Greece

Academic work
- Discipline: Sociology, law
- Institutions: Saint Mary's University (Halifax)

Evangelia Tastsoglou (born 1958), also known as Evie Tastsoglou, is a Greek-Canadian sociologist and lawyer. She is Professor of Sociology and International Development Studies at Saint Mary's University (Halifax) in Canada. Evangelina is also involved in the Growing Up Across Borders project (GRABS). She is known for her research relating to issues of gender and international migration, migration and globalization, immigrant and minority women and citizenship, and sexual and gender-based violence during forced migration.

Born in Piraeus, Greece, Tastsoglou earned her law degree from the National and Kapodistrian University of Athens in Greece in 1981, an MA and a PhD in sociology from Boston University in the United States in 1990 and an LL.M. from Dalhousie University in Canada in 2017. She has been vice-president of the Canadian Ethnic Studies Association and a member of the executive of the International Sociological Association, where she also chaired the Research Committee on Women in Society. She was Chair of the Department of Sociology and Criminology at Saint Mary's University from 2006 to 2012.

== Books ==
- Women, Migration and Citizenship: Making Local, National and Transnational Connections (Ashgate, 2006)
- Women, Gender and Diasporic Lives: Labor, Community and Identity in Greek Migrations (Lexington Books, 2009)
- Contours of Citizenship: Women, Diversity and the Practice of Citizenship (Ashgate, 2010)
- Immigrant Women in Atlantic Canada: Challenges, Negotiations, Re-Constructions (Canadian Scholars' Press/Women's Press, 2011)
- The Warmth of the Welcome: Is Atlantic Canada a Home away from Home for Immigrants? (Cape Breton University Press, 2015)
- Interrogating Gender, Violence, and the State in National and Transnational Contexts (Current Sociology Monograph Series, 2016)
