= Michigan Journal of Gender & Law =

- Discipline: Law review
- Language: English

Publication details
- History: 1993-present

Standard abbreviations
- Bluebook: Mich. J. Gender & L.
- ISO 4: Mich. J. Gend. Law

Indexing
- ISSN: 1095-8835

Links
- Journal homepage

The Michigan Journal of Gender & Law is a biannual law review published by an independent student group at the University of Michigan Law School. It publishes articles and student-written notes that explore how gender issues (and related issues of race, class, sexual orientation, gender identity, and culture) impact law and society.

The journal published its first issue in 1993.

== Abstracting and indexing ==
Articles published in Michigan Journal of Gender & Law are available online at WestLaw, LexisNexis, HeinOnline, and Law Review Commons, as well as at the University of Michigan Law School Scholarship Repository.
