= Feminism and Legal Theory Project =

- Formation: 1984
- Purpose: Study and debate topics related to feminist theory and law
- Director: Martha Albertson Fineman
- Parent organization: University of Wisconsin Law School (1984–90); Columbia Law School (1990–99); Cornell Law School (1999–2004); Emory University School of Law (2004–)
- Website: Official site

The Feminism and Legal Theory Project (FLT Project) is a project is to provide a forum for interdisciplinary feminist scholarship aimed at addressing issues relating to women and law. The project addresses the intersection of gender with issues relating to race, class, ability, and sexuality. The project nurtures scholars from around the world, bringing them together to study and debate a wide range of topics related to feminist theory and law.

The FLT Project assists beginning feminist scholars by providing multiple opportunities to present papers at academic conferences and for publication in one of the anthologies which are periodically collected from work presented at FLT Project workshops. The project has resulted in the publication of several books on feminist legal theory.

== Workshops ==
One of the hallmarks of the Feminism and Legal Theory Project is its quarterly, interdisciplinary workshops. Scholars from around the world converge to participate in "uncomfortable conversations" and theorize solutions to systemic legal issues. 2013 marks the beginning of the 30th year of operation for the Feminism and Legal Theory Project, and a special retrospective series of workshops reflecting on the past 30 years of feminist legal theory. Workshops over the 2013-2014 academic year will treat sex and reproduction, the family, violence, and workplaces.
