= Feminist method =

Means of generating feminist theory

The feminist method is a means of conducting investigations and generating theory from an explicitly feminist standpoint. Feminist methodologies are varied, but tend to have a few common aims or characteristics, including seeking to overcome biases in research, bringing about social change, displaying human diversity, and acknowledging the position of the researcher. Questioning normal scientific reasoning is another form of the feminist method.

Each of these methods must consist of different parts including: collection of evidence, testing of theories, presentation of data, and room for rebuttals. How research is scientifically backed up affects the results. Like consciousness raising, some feminist methods affect the collective emotions of women, when things like political statistics are more of a structural result When knowledge is either constructed by experiences, or discovered, it needs to both be reliable and valid.

Strong feminist supporters of this are Nancy Hartsock, Hilary Rose, and finally Sandra Harding. Feminist sociologists have made important contributions to this debate as they began to criticize positivism as a philosophical framework and, more specifically, its most acute methodological instrument—that of quantitative methods for its practice of detached and objective scientific research and the objectification of research subjects (Graham 1983b; Reinharz 1979).

More recently, feminist scholars have argued that quantitative methods are compatible with a feminist approach, so long as they are attentive to feminist theory. These methodological critiques were well placed against a backdrop of feminist scholarship struggling to find a place for alternative values within the academy. Such concerns emerged from a sense of despair and anger that knowledge, both academic and popular, was based on men's lives, male ways of thinking, and directed toward the problems articulated by men. Dorothy Smith (1974) argued that "sociology ... has been based on and built up within the male social universe".

== Objectivity and the construction of the Other ==
Feminist methods have, in large part, been scaffolded as a rebuttal to existing research methods that operate under imperialist, racist, and patriarchal assumptions about the research subject. By pointing out the biased perspectives and assumptions of researchers, feminist scholars work to elucidate the ways in which the idea of objectivity has operated merely as a stand-in for the white, male perspective, and how feminist methods, in contrast, work to produce knowledge in which "the researcher appears to us not as an invisible, anonymous voice of authority, but as a real, historical individual with concrete, specific desires and interests."

Also inherent in the traditional researcher-subject relationship is the subject-object relationship, for the researcher becomes the autonomous subject when they study other humans as objects, as in this case the "subject" is ironically objectified through the process of scientific investigation, which does not take into account their agency or the will of their community. Subjects are also simultaneously "Othered" by Western researchers who exotify their ways of life through "a Western discourse about the Other which is supported by 'institutions, vocabulary, scholarship, imagery, doctrines, even colonial bureaucracies and colonial styles.'"

Reinharz therefore posits that the destruction of the Other and the remodeling of the traditional subject-object relationship must occur simultaneously through explicit engagement with three different actors in feminist research: the researcher, the reader, and the people being studied. In this way, productive, feminist methods attempt to "demystify" and "decolonize" research through recognizing how traditional methods construct the Other and are cloaked in a false objectivity, and subsequently to deconstruct these narratives in order to "talk more creatively about research with particular groups and communities – women, the economically oppressed, ethnic minorities and indigenous peoples."

== Questioning biological sex as a scientific construct ==
Through questioning science Anne Fausto-Sterling came up with alternatives to the concept of having only two sexes, male and female. She argues that through biological development there is a possibility of having five sexes instead of two. She believes there are male, female, merm (male pseudohermaphrodites, i.e. when testicular tissue is present), ferm (female pseudohermaphrodites, i.e. when ovarian tissue is present), and herm (true hermaphrodites, i.e. when both testicular and ovarian tissue is present).

== Emotion ==
Alison Jaggar disputes the dichotomy between reason and emotion and argues that rationality needs emotion. She states emotions are normally associated with women and rationality is associated with men. She also claims that there are many theories as to the origins of emotions, and in the long run listening to emotions might lead to better decisions.
