= Brick Hut Café =

Restaurant information
- Established: 1975
- Location: 3017 Adeline Street, 3222 Adeline Street, 2512 San Pablo Avenue, Berkeley, California, United States

Brick Hut Café was a lesbian-feminist owned and operated community café located in Berkeley, California. It was founded in 1975.

== History ==
Sharon Davenport and Joan Antonuccio founded Brick Hut Cafe in February 1975. It served the LGBT community and its allies in the East Bay. It began as the Brick Hut Café Collective and was located at 3017 Adeline Street. Its causes included anti-nuclear action, anti-war activism, feminist and disability rights events, and AIDS awareness. Organizations supported included the Lyon-Martin Clinic, Queer Nation, and East Bay ACT UP. It also supported the feminist causes of Inez Garcia, Norma Jean Croy, Joan Little, and Yvonne Wanrow. Original members of the collective were Cheryl Jones, Claudia Hartley, Helen McKinley, Karen Ripley, Marshall Berzon, Randi Hepner, Sharon Davenport, and Wendy Welsh. The group came to include Cynthia La Mana and Teresa Chandler. It became a destination for Angela Davis, poet June Jordan, and musicians Holly Near and Mary Watkins. Watkins put the Hut on the cover of her record album, Something Moving, and called one of her songs "Brick Hut."

The first location of the Brick Hut Cafe was small, even with an outdoor patio. In 1983, with the financial help of the Cheese Board Collective, and the efforts of customers and friends, the Brick Hut moved to a new location at 3222 Adeline Street. A feminist collective, Seven Sisters Construction, helped remodel the new space. Local merchants, Berkeley City Council members, writers, musicians, and artists used the cafe as a meeting place. Eventually, the Brick Hut Cafe was robbed and vandalized over 17 times in 11 years, so a move to a newer, safer location was called for; this yielded the 2512 San Pablo Avenue location in 1995. This allowed for performance, meeting, and gallery space.

In 1996, the Brick Hut experienced extreme financial hardship. "Higher-than-anticipated overhead and less business than they projected" contributed to the problem. The cafe was forced to file for Chapter 11 bankruptcy, then Chapter 7, which ultimately shut its doors.

== Menu ==
The Brick Hut cafe initially served simple dishes such as eggs, waffles, pancakes, hash browns, toast, bacon, ham, and sausage links. They expanded to include the Brick Hut blueberry muffin and omelets named for feminist people and businesses that had supported or inspired the cafe. With the San Pablo Avenue location, the cafe was able to expand their menu even further to include salads, fruit bowls, chili, salsas, soups, and baked goods.

== See also ==
- Feminism in the United States
