= PLEXUS West Coast Women's Press =

American feminist newspaper (1974–1986)

PLEXUS
- West Coast Women's Press
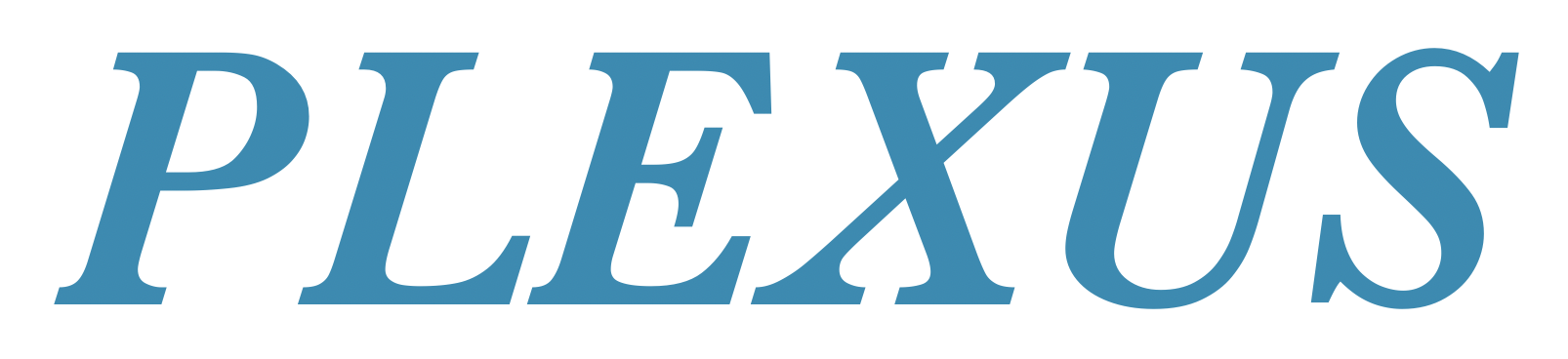
- Type: feminist newspaper
- Publisher: women's collective
- Founded: March 1974
- Ceased publication: July 1986
- Language: English
- City: Berkeley/Oakland California
- Country: US
- ISSN: 0274-5526
- OCLC number: 1071224495

PLEXUS West Coast Women's Press was an American radical feminist newspaper published in Berkeley, California from March 1974 to July 1986. PLEXUS published local, national, and international news. Its content was written by and for women in a traditional newspaper style.

== History ==
Becky Taber founded PLEXUS in March 1974. She was joined by Robin Bishop and Sandra Dasmann Swan, with all three women working together. PLEXUS started as a bi-weekly but became a monthly publication in June 1974. PLEXUS focused on events with particular resonance to feminist communities and also provided training to help women become journalists. Bishop named the publication and designed its logo which featured two triangles.

The publication ran as a women's collective based on collective decision-making. The collective originally consisted of around thirty women and met weekly on Sundays. The vast majority of work to produce PLEXUS—reporting, editing, layout, and photography—was done as volunteer labor. The first issue of PLEXUS was paid for by Taber's friend Ann McConnell; it cost $300. For the second issue, PLEXUS merged with another women's newspaper, Paracleit. That merger funded the second issue of PLEXUS. Taber paid for the fourth issue by selling ads for another newspaper.

Swan left the collective after a few months; Taber served as editor of the publication for a year before also leaving. Taber began earning a salary of $100 a month in August 1974. Other early collective members included Alta, Jane Bicek, J. California Cooper, Kelly Eve, Nancy Holland, Donna Hurst, April McMahon, Chris Orr, KDF Reynolds, Nancy Stockwell, Vivienne Walker-Crawford, Ann Weinstock, and Molly Wilcox. Journalist Andrea Lewis started her career as an editor of PLEXUS.

In August 1974, the publication received a $1,500 grant from the Point Foundation, supported by the Whole Earth Catalog. This grant enabled PLEXUS to publish for three months. However, the publication was mostly supported by advertising, and the publication sold for 25¢ an issue through local bookstore.

PLEXUS covered local, national, and international news on topics such as crime, justice, politics, education, and health. In addition it covered topics that mainstream news publishers either ignored, or failed to include women's perspectives, such as: abortion, the AIDS crisis, antipornography, the Equal Rights Amendment, herpes, home births and midwifery, law reform, lesbian mothers, rape, and women's peace sit-in. It included poetry, a list of resources for women, and a calendar of feminist events. The publication also featured inclusive content written by Judy Chicago, Jane Fonda, Ginny Fost, Inez Garcia, Judy Grahn, and Karen Silkwood. It also gave a voice to African American, Asian, Latino, and Native American women; a platform that was rare in other publications of the era.

Several of its important stories focused on criminal trials of female defendants with important feminist and social justice themes. According to staff writer kdf reynolds, "PLEXUS reporters, as radical feminists themselves, established trust leading to intimate and detailed interviews with defendants in murder trials of four women of color who relied on themselves for their own defense: Inez García, Joan (JoAnne) Little, Yvonne L. Wanrow, and Dessie Woods." PLEXUS also provided exclusive coverage of the trial of Wendy Yoshimura, an associate of Patty Hearst.

After six months of publication, PLEXUS had a circulation of 3,000. At its peak, the publication's readership was 50,000. In June 1985, the publication claimed to be "the oldest surviving women's publication on the West Coast" and was paying book stores 35¢ for each copy sold. It was also the recipient of the Community Journalism Award.

By 1986, PLEXUS had a reduced circulation of 2,000 and an estimated readership of 20,000. However, PLEXUS found it increasingly difficult to continue publication because of a changing media landscape, the mainstreaming of feminist ideas, and a drop in ad revenue. The cost of publishing increased, while the collective's staff decreased to sixteen.

In February 1986, it was discovered that a member who had joined the year before had embezzled $4,000 ($11,749 in today's money) from the collective's bank account. The group needed $7,000 to publish each issue. Already in financial difficulties, the collective did not publish PLEXUS in April. When published in May 1986, PLEXUS was reduced from its normal sixteen pages to eight pages. This issue noted that $13,000 was required for the publication to continue.

Commenting on the financial plight of PLEXUS, Patricia Holt, book editor of the San Francisco Chronicle, concluded that:

There is an amateurism in these pages that makes one wince, a political bias that often mars its credibility, a tone of martyrdom that grates. Yet, for all this, Plexus provides a vigorous and important forum in contemporary journalism – an insistence that dissent is still significant in American life and that diversity is still valued in an increasingly homogenous culture.

With the added promotion by Holt in San Francisco Chronicle, the collective raised $10,000 in May 1986. However, the collective decided that the publication could no longer be self-sufficient because of rising postage and printing costs. It formed a fundraising committee charged with organizing events to bring in the needed support by October. The fundraising committee was scheduled to begin its work in July 1986. However, the collective published its final edition of PLEXUS in July 1986.

== Impact and legacy ==
In Our Time: Memoir of a Revolution, Susan Brownmiller notes that there were "250 local, indigenous feminist publications" flourishing in the United States around the time that PLEXUS started. Nationally, most of these publication were short lived, with only three surviving for more than ten years: Off Our Backs in Washington, D.C., Sojourner: The Women's Forum in Cambridge, Massachusetts, and PLEXUS. PLEXUS was in continuous publication for thirteen years.

An archive of PLEXUS is available on microfilm and is held in the collection of several university libraries and in public libraries in Oakland and San Francisco. Gale also offers a fully digitized version of the PLEXUS archive.

== See also ==
- List of feminist periodicals in the United States
