= Frug =

Frug may refer to:

- Frug (surname)
- Frugging, fundraising technique
- The Frug, dance
  - "Rich Man's Frug", musical number from Sweet Charity
- Frenchie Pug
- Frug, a track from The Initial Friend E.P. by Rilo Kiley
- A fictional character in S.W.O.R.D.
