= Frug (surname) =

Frug is a Jewish surname. Notable people with the surname include:

- Gerald Frug (born 1939), American law professor, husband of Mary Joe Frug
- Mary Joe Frug (1941–1991), American law professor, feminist and murder victim
- Simon Frug (1860–1916), Russian Jewish poet, lyricist and author
