= Alta (poet) =

American writer and publisher (1942–2024)

- Born: Alta Gerrey; May 22, 1942; Reno, Nevada, U.S.
- Died: March 10, 2024 (aged 81); Oakland, California, U.S.
- Spouse(s): Danny Bosserman (divorced) Daniel Skarry (divorced)
- Partner: 2
- Children: 2
- Writing career
- Genre: Poetry

Alta Gerrey (May 22, 1942 – March 10, 2024) was an American poet, prose writer, and publisher, best known as the founder of the feminist press Shameless Hussy Press and editor of the Shameless Hussy Review. Her 1980 collection The Shameless Hussy won the American Book Award in 1981. She is featured in the feminist history film She's Beautiful When She's Angry.

Alta was also one of the early collective members of the influential Bay Area feminist newspaper PLEXUS, for which she wrote a monthly column on the importance of promoting women's writing and creativity.

== Biography ==
=== Shameless Hussy Press ===
Alta started Shameless Hussy Press in 1969. The first women-owned feminist press in California, it opened during the time of second-wave feminism. Alta used a printing press in her garage to publish books by authors such as Susan Griffin, Pat Parker, and Mitsuye Yamada. Yamada later described Alta as an "energetic feminist poet" who promoted Yamada's first volume of poetry "at women’s conferences, women’s health centers, and lesbian bars." The press published the first edition of For Colored Girls Who Have Considered Suicide, When the Rainbow is Enuf by Ntozake Shange, and Mary Mackey's first novel, Immersion (1972). They also published poetry by men: "Alta reasoned that since 6 percent of the books published in the U.S. were by women, 6 percent of the books she published should be by men."

The press closed in 1989; its archive is held at University of California Santa Cruz.

=== Poetry and prose ===
Her first volume of feminist poetry, Freedom's in Sight, was published in 1969, and some of her poems were anthologized in such collections as From Feminism to Liberation (Philip G. Altbach and Edith S. Hoshino, eds, 1971). Her 1980 collected works The Shameless Hussy (Crossing Press) won the American Book Award in 1981.

=== Personal life ===
Alta was born in Reno, Nevada on May 22, 1942. She started the Shameless Hussy Press with her second husband. She wrote a volume of "blatant lesbian poems", Letters to Women (1969). After the press closed she started operating an art gallery in Berkeley, California. She died of breast cancer on March 10, 2024, in Oakland, California.

== Works ==
Alta's works include:

- Freedom's in Sight. Aldebaran Review, 1969.
- Letters to Women. Shameless Hussy Press, 1970.
- poems & prose by alta. k.n.o.w., 1971.
- burn this & memorize yourself. Times Change, 1971.
- song of the wife, song of the mistress. Shameless Hussy Press, 1971.
- No Visible Means of Support. Shameless Hussy Press, 1971.
- True Story. Mama's Press, 1973.
- Momma. Times Change, 1974.
- i am not a practicing angel. Crossing Press, 1975.
- Pauline & the Mysterious Pervert. Wyrd Press, 1975.
- Theme & Variations. Aldeberan Review, 1975.
- The Shameless Hussy, 1980.
- Deluged with dudes: platonic & erotic love poems to men. Shameless Hussy Press, 1989.
- Traveling tales: flings I've flung in foreign parts. Acapella Communications, 1990.

== Awards ==
- 1981 American Book Award
