= Mary Joe Frug =

American legal scholar

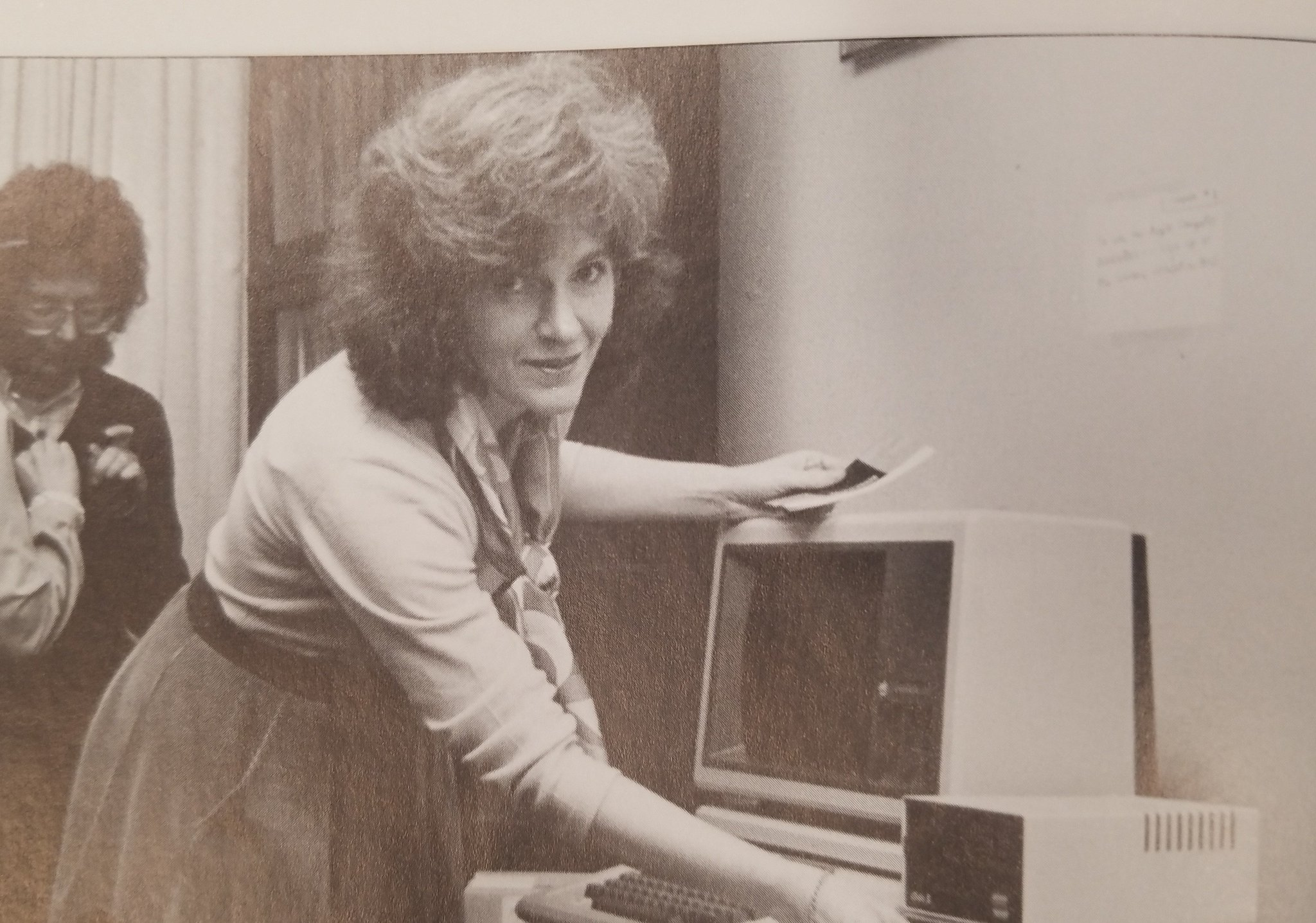
- Born: Mary Joe Gaw; 1941; St. Joseph, Missouri, U.S.
- Died: April 4, 1991 (aged 49–50); Cambridge, Massachusetts, U.S.
- Cause of death: Stabbing
- Occupations: Professor; Legal scholar
- Known for: Legal postmodern feminist theory Victim of unsolved murder
- Spouse: Gerald Frug

Mary Joe Frug (née Gaw; 1941 – April 4, 1991) was a professor at New England Law Boston, and a leading feminist legal scholar. She is considered a forerunner of legal postmodern feminist theory. Much of her work was collected in the posthumously-published book, Postmodern Legal Feminism. She is the author of the casebook Women and the Law.

On April 4, 1991, Frug was murdered on the streets of Cambridge, Massachusetts, near the home that she shared with her husband, Harvard Law professor Gerald Frug, and their two children. The murder remains unsolved.

== Career ==
Frug received a Bachelor of Arts from Wellesley College, a Juris Doctor from the National Law Center at George Washington University, and a Master of Laws from New York University. She worked for three years providing free legal services to low income clients in Washington, D.C. and New York. From 1975 to 1981, she was a professor at the Villanova University School of Law. In 1981, she joined the New England School of Law, where she taught until 1991. At the time of her death, she was on sabbatical, doing research as a fellow at Radcliffe College’s Bunting Institute.

Frug was recognized in the legal field for her work in legal postmodern feminist theory. She wrote a casebook entitled Women and the Law, and a collection of essays, Postmodern Legal Feminism (published in 1992, after her death). In her essay "A Postmodern Feminist Legal Manifesto", she argued for three general claims that explain the connection between feminism and law: “legal rules permit and sometimes mandate the terrorization of the female body”, “legal rules permit and sometimes mandate the maternalization of the female body”, and “legal rules permit and sometimes mandate the sexualization of the female body”. Her work was controversial and at times characterized as radical.

Frug was a founding member of a group of female lawyers and legal scholars known as the Fem-Crits, part of the heterodox Critical Legal Studies movement (her husband, Gerald, was also an adherent of CLS). Fem-Crits applied the principles of CLS to feminism, to show how the law subordinates women in a male-dominated power structure. The group has been described as a foundational part of "progressive resistance to conservative legal thought" during the 1980s Reagan revolution, and a breakaway move from the "white male-dominated Conference on Critical Legal Studies."

== Personal life ==
Frug was born as Mary Joe Gaw in St. Joseph, Missouri in 1941. In 1968, she married Gerald Frug, with whom she had two children. In 1981, Gerald obtained a professorship at Harvard Law School, and the family moved from the Philadelphia area to Cambridge.

== Death ==
On the evening of April 4, 1991, Frug was fatally stabbed while walking to a local convenience store. She received multiple wounds in the chest and upper thighs. The murder occurred in the exclusive Brattle St. neighborhood of Cambridge, in front of the Armenian Holy Trinity Apostolic Church at the corner of Sparks St. and Brewster St., less than 300 yards from her home. A passing motorist entered the church for help. Members of the choir practicing inside came out, including a Harvard professor who recognized Frug, ran to her house, and returned with her husband and daughter. At 8:57 pm, Frug was taken away by ambulance. She was pronounced dead on arrival at Mount Auburn Hospital.

=== Murder investigation ===
The investigation by local police was soon joined by other police departments and the FBI. Frug's purse was found at the scene, which led investigators to rule out robbery as the motive. A witness a block away described a white male, 5'10"-6'0", late teens to early 20s, brown hair, dressed in dark clothing, running from the scene. Shoe prints were found and plaster casts taken. The murder weapon, unrecovered, was determined to be a military-style knife. A knife was found near the crime scene, but forensic examination failed to connect it to the murder.

The investigation initially considered that Frug may have been targeted for her feminist academic work. This line of inquiry was eventually abandoned. One year from her death, the New England School of Law offered a $25,000 reward for information leading to arrest. There were no suspects, no leads, and no idea of motive at the time.

Frug's murder remains unsolved. In 2019, a newly-formed cold case unit in Middlesex County, Massachusetts took up the case.

== Harvard Law Review controversy ==
In March 1992, the prestigious, student-edited scholarly journal, the Harvard Law Review, published an unfinished draft article by Frug called "A Postmodern Feminist Legal Manifesto," which explored legal theories on violence toward women. Gerald Frug had submitted the article on his late wife's behalf. Some members of the Review were opposed to publishing the piece, and later parodied it in "He-Manifesto of Post-Mortem Legal Feminism", which was included in the Harvard Law Revue, an annual spoof of the Review. The essay argued that Frug's theories were the concoction of paranoid feminists. It was filled with inside jokes and sexual innuendo, suggested that Frug's husband's tenure at Harvard Law was the only reason the paper was published, and mocked her death. On April 4, 1992, the spoof Revue was presented at the annual banquet introducing the new editors of the Harvard Law Review. The date happened to be on the anniversary of Frug's death; her husband was among the invitees but did not attend.

At the time of the incident, Harvard Law, considered to be one of the top law schools in the US, was in the midst of a decade-long culture war. During the 1970s, Harvard hired three law professors who came to be known as the founders of the critical legal studies movement, also referred to as the Crits. With Marxist influence, the Crits saw the law as a tool for keeping privileged classes in power and control, and their mission, to deconstruct it. In the 1980s, appearing across university campuses, race and gender issues, diversity, and political correctness were embraced by the Crits and entered the Harvard Law conflict. Opposing the Crits over policies and hiring decisions was the traditionalist faction of the faculty, holding that the law was necessary to maintain order and equity in society. In a comment on the Frug murder, one Harvard Law professor said, "If there was going to be a murder, I'm surprised it didn't happen here—in the halls of the law school. There are long periods of time when civilized relationships are absent." The National Law Journal described Harvard Law in that period as "the Beirut of legal education."

News of the essay spread in the following days, and an uproar ensued that reached the national news media. The Wall Street Journal called the furor "a vile circus". In an open letter signed by most of the Harvard law faculty, the parody was called "contemptible and cruel." Two high-profile faculty members, Laurence Tribe and Alan Dershowitz, publicly clashed over the issue. Tribe forcefully condemned the authors: he compared the parody to Ku Klux Klan propaganda, called it a rape "in all but biological reality", and asked, "What is the point of teaching? I'm sharpening their knives to stab innocent victims." Dershowitz defended the authors, calling the parody "somewhat" offensive, and the reaction a "witch hunt": “The overreaction to the spoof is a reflection of the power of women and blacks to define the content of what is politically correct and incorrect on college and law school campuses." Co-authors Craig Coben and Kenneth Fenyo apologized in a statement, particularly to Frug's husband. They added that they did not mean to distribute the article on the anniversary of her death. The statement was signed by other members of the Review, including the then-editor Paul Clement.

== Legacy ==
In 1994, the Mary Joe Frug Fund was launched to establish an endowed chair at New England Law in her memory, to allow visiting professors to come to New England Law to teach women's issues in the law. The Women's Law Caucus at New England Law established the Mary Joe Frug Grant to provide "stipends for students at New England who devote their summers to improving the lives of women."

New England Law houses the "Professor Mary Joe Frug Women and the Law Collection" at its library. A fourth edition of Frug's casebook, Women and the Law, now titled Mary Joe Frug's Women and the Law, was published in 2007.

In a commemorative piece written by colleagues following Frug's death, Gary Minda, a Cardozo Law professor, wrote: "Mary Joe inspires all of us to challenge the constraints of gender and to remain hopeful and optimistic about the possibility of coming to grips with the dilemmas of difference that separate our lives."

In 2016, the New England Law Review's Mary Joe Frug Memorial Symposium marked the 25th anniversary of Frug's death. In her written contribution, Brooklyn Law School professor Elizabeth M. Schneider commented: "Twenty-five years after her death, I see even more of a need for the integration of Mary Joe's perspectives into ongoing work on feminist legal theory and practice. We are in the midst of a very fragmented time, where there seems to be little appreciation of, and sensitivity to, the history of feminist legal theory and practice... Mary Joe looked at feminist legal dilemmas in particular contexts; nuance was key, and her views were not totalistic. She vigorously rejected gender stereotypes, including the stereotype of victim. Constant re-thinking, not rigidity, was the name of the game. Also, flexibility over time."

== See also ==
- Critical legal studies
- List of unsolved murders (1900–1979)
