= Colville High School =

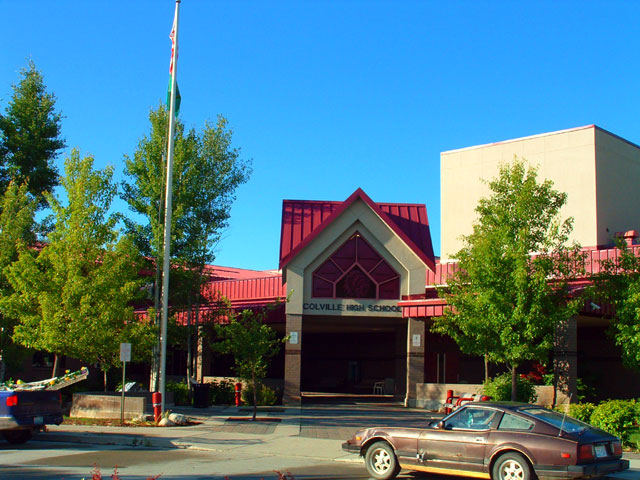
- CHS Entrance

Location
- 154 E Highway 20; Colville, Washington 99114; United States
- Coordinates: 48°32′40″N 117°52′35″W

Information
- Motto: Knowledge is nature, nature is us.
- Established: 1897, (1992)
- School district: Colville School District
- NCES School ID: 530163000282
- Principal: Bradley Groce
- Teaching staff: 26.99 (FTE)
- Grades: 9-12
- Enrollment: 509 (2023-2024)
- Student to teacher ratio: 18.86
- Colors: Crimson & Silver
- Fight song: "Fight 1"
- Mascot: Crimson Hawks
- Website: chs.colsd.org/

Colville High School is a public secondary school located in the city of Colville, Washington, United States. They also offer Advanced Placement (AP) classes to students.

== Notable alumni ==
- Mike Dodson
- Yvonne Wanrow
