= Elizabeth M. Schneider =

American law professor (born c. 1948)

Elizabeth M. Schneider (born c. 1948) is an American lawyer, law professor, and leading feminist scholar in the fields of gender law, domestic violence, and federal civil litigation. She was a forerunner in establishing that violence against women is a public harm, and in the legal defense of battered women who kill in self-defense. During the 1970s, Schneider was a staff attorney at the Center for Constitutional Rights, a non-profit legal activist group supporting civil rights and social justice, co-founded by William Kunstler. Since 1983, she has been a professor of law at Brooklyn Law School. She wrote Battered Women and Feminist Lawmaking (2000), co-wrote Domestic Violence and the Law: Theory and Practice (2013; originally, Battered Women and the Law, 2001), and co-edited Women and the Law Stories (2011).

== Education ==
Schneider graduated from Bryn Mawr College with a Bachelor of Arts cum laude with Honors in Political Science in 1968. She was a Leverhulme Fellow at the London School of Economics (LSE) where she received a Master of Science in Political Sociology in 1969. While at university, Schneider was involved in civil rights and anti-war activism. Returning to the US from LSE, she joined the Vera Institute of Justice, a criminal justice reform think tank. She began meeting feminist lawyers and was persuaded of the need for women to enter law. She enrolled in the New York University School of Law, where she was an Arthur Garfield Hays Civil Liberties Fellow, and received her Juris Doctor in 1973. She clerked for the late United States District Judge Constance Baker Motley of the Southern District of New York, considered "one of the architects" of the civil rights movement in American law.

== Career ==
In 1971 and 1972, while in law school, Schneider undertook a summer student internship at the Center for Constitutional Rights (CCR), a progressive non-profit legal advocacy organization supporting activism in civil rights and social justice. Co-founded by controversial civil rights lawyer William Kunstler, CCR was described as the "leading gathering place for radical lawyers in the country". Upon completing law school, Schneider joined CCR in 1973 as a full-time staff attorney.

CCR chose cases that would raise public awareness of an issue, generate media attention, and energize activists being harassed by local law enforcement. Schneider stated that CCR "asserted rights not simply to advance legal argument or to win a case but to express the politics, vision, and demands of a social movement." CCR led the way in making women’s rights a major focus of its work, and in hiring women lawyers for that job. Schneider joined lawyers Nancy Stearns, Rhonda Copelon and Janice Goodman in creating CCR's women's rights practice, at a time when women represented 3% of US lawyers admitted to the bar. They did pioneering work in the legal defense of battered women who kill in self-defense, and in establishing that domestic violence is not a private problem but a public harm.

Schneider litigated notable civil rights and women's rights cases. In 1976, in an appeal filed at the 5th U.S. Circuit Court of Appeals, Kunstler and Schneider obtained a reversal of H. Rap Brown's 1968 federal firearms conviction, when evidence was presented that the trial judge had stated to members of the Louisiana State Bar Association that he was going to "get that nigger". In 1977, Schneider and Stearns argued the successful appeal of State of Washington v. Wanrow, one of the first women's self-defense cases.

In State v. Wanrow, the Washington Supreme Court in 1977 handed down a landmark decision in upholding the reversal of Wanrow's 1973 murder conviction. While at a friend's home with her children, Wanrow had shot two men who had entered the house, killing one and injuring the other. Against her claim of self-defense, she was convicted by a jury of second-degree murder and first-degree assault, and sentenced to 20 years. The conviction was reversed on appeal, based on errors by the trial judge. The reversal was upheld by the Washington Supreme Court. Among its findings, the Supreme Court ruled that the jury should have been permitted to hear the full circumstances surrounding the shooting, not only those ‘‘at or immediately before the killing’’ as they had been instructed, in order to judge the reasonableness of Wanrow's belief in the need for self-defense. The jury should also have been instructed to consider reasonable action from Wanrow's point of view, that of a 5'4", 120 lb. woman, on crutches, with her foot in a cast, facing a 6'2" inebriated man who she believed to be an active child molester. The Court noted that the trial judge's reasonable man instructions, using male pronouns, ‘‘[left] the jury with the impression the objective standard to be applied is that applicable to an altercation between two men.’’ The jury should have been instructed to consider the "degree of force which ... a reasonable person in the same situation ... seeing what (s)he sees and knowing what (s)he knows, ... would believe is necessary." Speaking at the time, Schneider stated that the decision was the first to deal with the legal precedent for women's self-defense, "not a separate standard for women only, but equal application of the law to women." The analysis and strategies that emerged became the framework of many future battered women's cases involving self-defense.

In 1983, Schneider joined the faculty of Brooklyn Law School, where she is the Rose L. Hoffer Professor of Law. Her areas of academic expertise are civil procedure, civil rights, domestic violence and women's rights. She has been a visiting professor of law at Harvard Law School and Columbia Law School.

Over her career, Schneider advocated in the media for women's rights. In 1989, when the governors of two states commuted the sentences of three women who had killed their male partners, Schneider commented in the New York Times News Service that their actions showed a new understanding of the law. She noted that courts were beginning to consider a decade of research into battered woman syndrome: women on trial for killing or assaulting abusive husbands had begun to plead self-defense, a plea formerly used only when the husband was attempting murder at the moment he was killed.

Schneider lectures internationally on gender and law and domestic violence. She was a consultant for the UN Secretary-General’s In-Depth Study of All Forms of Violence Against Women, presented to the United Nations General Assembly in 2006. She has authored three books on domestic violence and women and the law.

== Books ==
Schneider is the author of Battered Women and Feminist Lawmaking (Yale University Press, 2000), which won the 2000 Association of American Publishers Professional-Scholarly Publishing Award in Law. A Columbia Journal of Gender & Law review described it as an "outstanding critical overview of the history of the battered women’s movement and the complex legal and social issues facing battered women... [adopting] a feminist theoretical approach, which links theory with practice, to analyze the legal and social responses to domestic violence over the last two decades," emphasizing that "domestic violence is not an isolated problem, but, rather, is embedded in gender inequality that permeates our society."

Schneider is the co-editor of Women and the Law Stories (Foundation Press, 2011; with Stephanie M. Wildman), discussing landmark cases in establishing women’s legal rights, examining litigants, history, parties, strategies, and theoretical implications. Subject areas covered include history, constitutional law, reproductive freedom, the workplace, the family, and women in the legal profession, domestic violence, and rape.

Schneider is a co-author of the casebook, Domestic Violence and the Law: Theory and Practice (Foundation Press, 2013), with Cheryl Hanna, Emily J. Sack and Judith G. Greenberg. It was first published in 2001 as Battered Women and the Law, co-authored with Clare Dalton. The 2013 third edition examines domestic violence from theoretical, practical, and interdisciplinary perspectives, excerpting from a variety of sources including fiction, amicus briefs, academic articles, practice materials and personal narratives, and expanding on recent US Supreme Court cases.

== Personal life ==
Schneider was born c. 1948. She has two children. She was divorced in 1986. In 2017, she placed a personal ad in the Yale Alumni Magazine. Benjamin Liptzin, a retired geriatric psychiatrist and professor emeritus of psychiatry at Tufts University School of Medicine, replied. The couple were married in 2020, via Zoom.
