= Colville School District =

School district in Washington, US

Address
- 217 S Hofstetter Street Colville, Washington, 99114; United States
- Coordinates: 48°32′34″N 117°53′48″W

District information
- Grades: Pre-K through 12
- Superintendent: Kevin Knight
- NCES District ID: 5301630
- Affiliation(s): Washington State Office of Superintendent of Public Instruction, U.S. Department of Education

Students and staff
- Students: 1,717 (2017–2018)

Other information
- Website: colsd.org/

Colville School District No. 115 is a public school district in Stevens County, Washington, and serves the town of Colville. The district offers classes from Pre-K to Grade 12.

== Schools ==
=== High schools ===
Colville High School
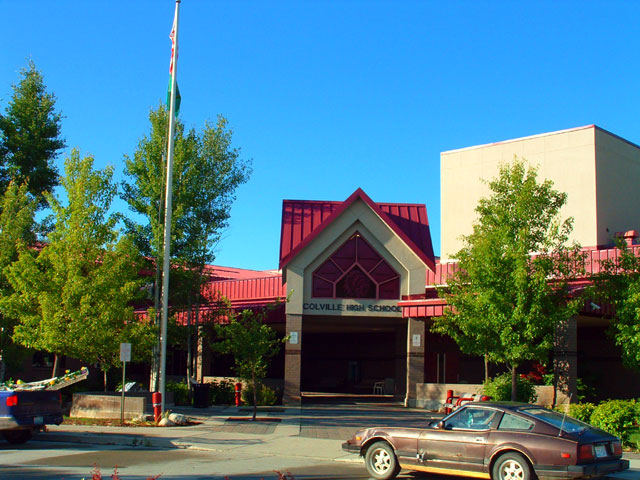

Location
- 154 Hwy 20 East; Colville, WA 99114

Colville High School was constructed in 1993 and serves grades 9–12.

This high school was built to replace the old high school located on Elm Street. The old high school has been renovated into a community college.

=== Junior high schools ===
Colville Junior High School was constructed in 1972 and serves grades 6–8.

=== Elementary schools ===
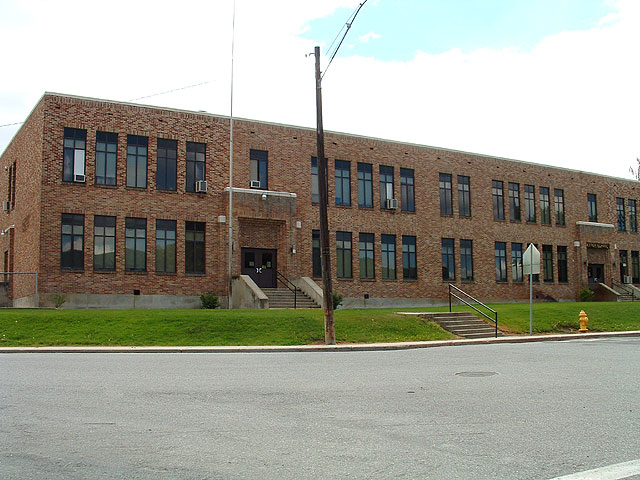
Aster Elementary

Fort Colville Elementary was constructed in 1982 and serves Grades 3rd, 4th, and 5th.

Hofstetter Elementary was constructed in 1951s and serves grades Kindergarten, 1st and 2nd.

Aster Elementary was constructed in 1940 as a Works Progress Administration project and serves as an Alternative High School, Preschool, and a Homeschooling Program.
