= Rhonda Copelon =

American human rights lawyer

Rhonda Copelon (September 15, 1944 – May 6, 2010) was an American human rights lawyer working for women's and human rights. She is known for her contributions to Filártiga v. Peña-Irala, a civil case that extended the jurisdiction of United States courts in some instances.

== Early life and education ==
Rhonda Copelon was born on September 15, 1944, in New Haven, the daughter of Herman and Katherine Copelon.

She graduated from Bryn Mawr College in 1966 with a degree in history and political science and earned her law degree at Yale, graduating in 1970.

== Career ==
Copelon worked as an attorney with the Center for Constitutional Rights (CCR) for a dozen years, particularly regarding cases involving reproductive rights. She successfully defended the right of African American unwed mothers to work as teacher's aides in Mississippi in front of the Supreme Court in Drew v. Andrews.

She lost Harris v. McRae, a challenge to the Hyde Amendment which cut Medicaid funding for abortions. After leaving the CCR in 1983, she would remain a board member for the rest of her life. She was also a founding board member of the National Economic and Social Initiative, an Advisory Board member of Human Rights Watch, Women's Rights Watch, and Legal Advisor to and founder of Women's Caucus for Gender Justice. By the early 1980s, Copelon had come to realize the importance of establishing international rights as a way of protecting women's rights.

Copelon joined the faculty of the CUNY Law School at Queens College when it opened in 1983 and there, with Celina Romany, co-founded the International Women's Human Rights Clinic in 1992. She would lead the fight, assisted by her students, in establishing rape during war as a crime of genocide and torture. She filed countless amicus briefs in cases heard by the International Criminal Tribunals for the former Yugoslavia and Rwanda and published widely on the need to treat rape during armed conflicts as a war crime.

With the IWHRC, Copelon attended and presented her work at the UN World Conference on Human Rights in Vienna in 1993, the population and development conference in Cairo, and the Beijing World Conference on Women in 1995.

=== Filártiga v. Peña-Irala ===
In the 1970s, Copelon worked with Peter Weiss, another lawyer at the Center for Constitutional Rights on this case, which involved a Paraguayan family whose son was tortured to death by police in Asunción. After the police chief moved to New York, the slain victim's sister filed suit against the police chief. The case utilized the 1789 Alien Tort Claims Act to categorize freedom from torture as a human rights norm as well as a part of the laws of the United States.

On July 30, 1980, a federal appeals court in New York ruled that the family had the right to sue for damages. This was, incidentally, the same day that Harris v. McRae was decided.

=== International Criminal Court ===
Through the Women's Caucus for Gender Justice, Copelon worked with other women lawyers to ensure that gender crimes were included within the mandate of the International Criminal Court (ICC). Copelon was a NGO delegate and active negotiator at the United Nations Preparatory Committees and the Rome Diplomatic Conference establishing the ICC.

== Personal life ==
After losing Harris v. McRae, Copelon and friends hand-built a home on Long Island which served as a recuperation destination for other feminist activists.

Copelon was married to David Shoenbrod.

== Death ==
After a four-year fight against ovarian cancer, Copelon died at her home in Manhattan at the age of 65.

In 2012, Catherine Albisa donated the Rhonda Copelon papers to the Sophia Smith Collection at Smith College Special Collections. Her papers include "Legal documents and research, correspondence, teaching materials, published writings, panel presentations, notes, and audio and video recordings documenting Copelon's legal activism and teaching. Major topics include reproductive rights, domestic violence, international women's rights, AIDS legislation."
