= Gerald Frug =

American legal scholar (1939–2023)

Gerald E. Frug (July 31, 1939 – November 7, 2023) was an American legal scholar. He was the Louis D. Brandeis Professor of Law emeritus at Harvard Law School, and a leading academic authority on local government law. He was married to feminist law professor Mary Joe Frug, who was murdered in 1991.

== Biography ==
Frug graduated from the University of California, Berkeley and Harvard Law School, and previously worked for the City of New York and the Equal Employment Opportunity Commission. He advocated regional cooperation to solve local government problems. Frug died on November 7, 2023, at the age of 84.

== Publications ==
- Barron, David J., and Gerald E. Frug. City Bound: How States Stifle Urban Innovation (Cornell University Press 2009).
- Barron, David, Gerald E. Frug & Rick Su. Dispelling the Myth of Home Rule: Local Power in Greater Boston (Rappaport Institute for Greater Boston 1st ed. 2004).
- Frug, Gerald E. "Is Secession from the City of Los Angeles a Good Idea?" 49 University of California - Los Angeles Law Review 1783 (2002).
- Frug, Gerald E. City Making: Building Communities without Building Walls (Princeton University Press 1999).
- Frug, Gerald E. "City Services," 73 New York University Law Review 23 (1998).(Reprinted in 30 Land Use and Environmental Law, 1999)
- Frug, Gerald E. Local Government Law (West Publishing 2nd ed. 1994).
- Frug, Gerald E. "Administrative Democracy," 40 Toronto Law Journal 240 (1990).(Reprinted in D. Rosenbloom and R. Schwartz eds., Handbook on Regulation and Administrative Law 519, 1994; and in Bill Jenkins and Edward C. Page eds., the Foundations of Bureaucracy in Economic and Social Thought, 2004).
