= Inez García =

American activist (1941–2003)

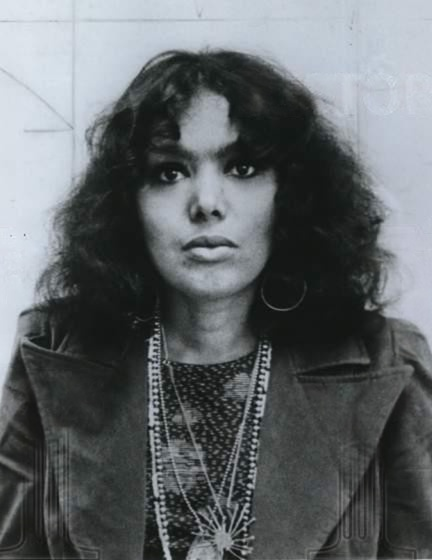
- García c. 1977
- Born: 1941; New York City, New York
- Died: 2003 (aged 61–62); Miami, Florida
- Spouse: Juan García Cardenas

Inez García (1941–2003) was an American woman who gained notoriety within the feminist movement after being accused of the murder of a man who had helped another man rape her in 1974.

== Background ==
García was born in New York City and raised in Spanish Harlem. Her ethnic heritage was mixed Puerto Rican and Cuban. She married the Cuban exile and anti-Castro activist Juan García Cardenas, and the two of them had a son in 1963.

Cardenas was imprisoned in Soledad, California, after being convicted of involvement in a political bombing in Los Angeles claimed by Poder Cubano. In 1971, Garcia moved to Soledad to be nearer to her husband. She worked in the lettuce fields and supplemented her income with welfare. She earned a reputation in the small, mostly Chicano community as a devout and chaste Catholic. She shared an apartment with Fred Medrano, a Texan who was involved in the illegal drug trade.

== Rape and killing ==
On March 17, 1974, García was entertaining friends at her apartment; Medrano also had a guest, with whom he was smoking marijuana. Louie Castillo and Miguel Jimenez, Soledad locals and acquaintances of Medrano, arrived in a state of inebriation to purchase heroin from Medrano. They began harassing García and her friends, and Garcia's guests departed, leaving García with the others in the apartment. An argument arose between Medrano and Castillo, who was envious of Medrano's status as the primary drug connection in Soledad and was resentful that an "outsider" had become so successful. The argument became physical, and Medrano was winning the fight until the 300-pound Jimenez intervened, beating Medrano and threatening him with a knife.

Jimenez and Castillo took García to an alley behind the building, where Jimenez restrained and Castillo raped her, according to García's testimony, "to show me what a hometown boy was." The two men left the scene for a neighbor's house. Shortly after arriving, they (or someone else) called the García-Medrano residence, laughing, taunting, and threatening García's life if she did not leave town. García armed herself with her son's .22 rifle, and she and Medrano drove the six blocks to the residence where Castillo and Jimenez were located. Accounts vary as to precisely what occurred next, but, according to Garcia's testimony during her 1975 retrial, Jimenez appeared to brandish his knife, and García shot him. Castillo, meanwhile, escaped into a nearby park. Medrano and García continued until they arrived at the home of the two friends that had visited her earlier, and when the police arrived, she surrendered to them.

While being interrogated, García claimed that the two men had only attempted to rape her. At the jail, she was tested for drugs and alcohol but not for signs of rape. Castillo was never charged with any crime.

== Trials ==
When Cardenas learned of his wife's predicament, he recommended that she retain Charles Garry, a criminal attorney who had gained a reputation in Soledad State Penitentiary as the defender of George Jackson, Huey P. Newton, and Bobby Seale. At the same time, news of the case reached the San Francisco Bay Area, where the women's rights and Chicano movements were at their apex. García began speaking to women's groups in the area, while the Inez Garcia Defense Committee raised money for the defense and publicized the case, hoping to highlight it as a prime example of gender inequity in the criminal justice system rather than a simple murder.

Through her contact with feminist groups, Garcia became an outspoken critic of patriarchy, accusing her own judge of prejudice and sexism. During the trial, Garry argued that García had acted with diminished capacity due to the trauma of her rape and a history of mental instability. Not only did this defense fail to win the sympathy of the jury, it also disappointed feminists who preferred to project the image of García as a symbol of strength and resistance to male dominance. García was convicted of second degree murder, sentenced, and served 15 months of a five-year-to-life sentence in the California Institution for Women before her appeal was heard.

During her retrial, García was defended by the feminist lawyer Susan Jordan. Jordan dropped the "diminished capacity" defense, instead arguing simple self-defense. The argument convinced the jury, which acquitted her.

== Aftermath ==
The case was construed in legal circles as a ruling in favor of a woman's right to use deadly force against sexual assault. García herself continued to advocate for the rights of women and rape victims, but her activism diminished as a result of her infirmity. Toward the end of her life, she battled cancer and died in February 2003 in Miami.

As a cause celebrity, her case inspired numerous works of art and music, including the Beverly Grant folk song "Inez", performed with the group The Human Condition; Marge Piercy's poem "For Inez Garcia"; and (partly, along with Joan Little) inspired Jayne Cortez's poem "Rape."

== See also ==
- Joan Little
- Yvonne Wanrow
- Aileen Wuornos
