= Joan Little =

African-American woman acquitted in murder trial of a white prison guard

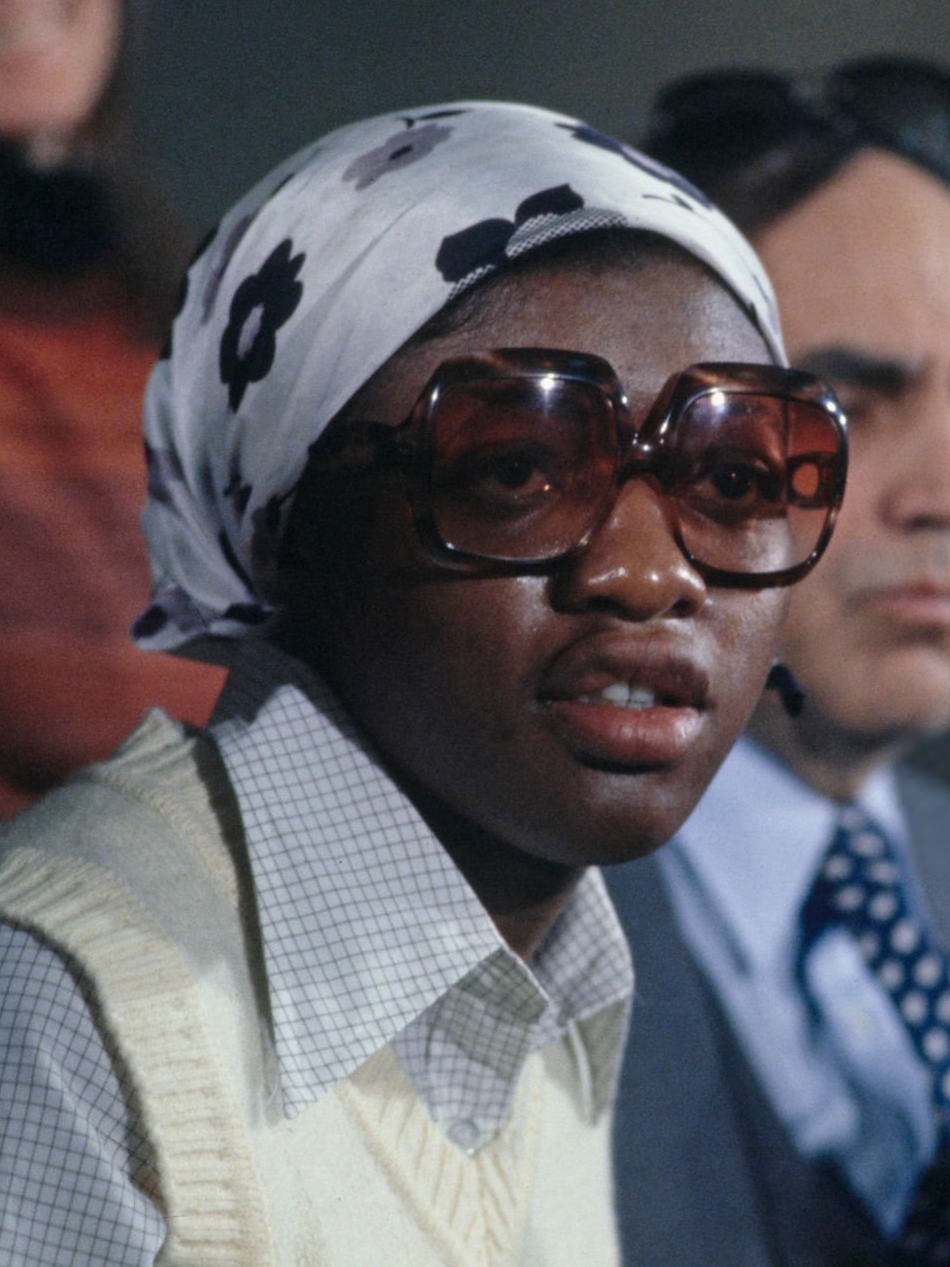
- Little in 1978
- Born: May 8, 1954 (age 72); Washington, North Carolina, U.S.
- Known for: Being acquitted of the death of a white prison guard whom she killed in self-defense

Joan Little (pronounced "Jo Ann") (born May 8, 1954) is an African-American woman who was charged with the 1974 killing of Clarence Alligood, a white prison guard at Beaufort County Jail in Washington, North Carolina, who attempted to rape Little before she could escape. Her case became a cause célèbre of the civil rights, feminist, and anti-death penalty movements. Little was charged with murder in the death, but was later acquitted. She was the first woman in United States history to be acquitted of murder using the defense that she used deadly force to resist sexual assault. Her case also has become classic in legal circles as a pioneering instance of the application of scientific jury selection.

== Early life ==
Little was born and raised until age 15 in Washington, a town of under 10,000 in North Carolina's rural Atlantic coastal region. Her mother, Jessie Williams, was a "religious fanatic" who frequently consulted "root workers," or hoodoo folk healers. Her father was a security guard in Brooklyn, New York. The eldest of six blood siblings, she was forced to care for them and her four half-siblings as well. She took to running away and hiding and soon fell in with an older crowd who supported her rebellion. Her social worker, Jean Nelson, who once called her an "escape artist," also noted her intelligence, telling her "some day you could do a lot of good." As a teenager, she worked in the tobacco industry and as a waitress. In 1973, she went to work with a sheetrock finisher named Julius Rogers, whom she later accompanied to Greenville and subsequently to Chapel Hill, where she would become entangled with the law.

== Criminality ==
Little's problems with the law began in 1968, when her mother asked a judge to declare her a truant and to commit her to the Dobbs Farm Training School in Kinston, North Carolina. After a few weeks at Dobbs, Little fled, walking to a nearby service station, where she and a friend hitched a ride back to Washington. Her mother realized she had not been duly released and so sought to legitimize her daughter's situation by procuring an official release. She later sent Joan to live with relatives in Philadelphia. Three weeks after graduating from high school there, Joan developed a thyroid problem and returned to North Carolina for an operation.

In December 1973 and January 1974, Little, then 20, incurred a spate of arrests for theft and eventually for breaking and entering, with escalating legal consequences. In the coastal town of Jacksonville, North Carolina, at the end of 1973, she was charged with the possession of stolen goods and a sawed-off shotgun, but was not prosecuted. On January 3, 1974, she was arrested in Washington, North Carolina, for shoplifting. That charge, too, was dismissed. Six days later, she was again arrested for shoplifting, a charge for which she was given a six-month suspended sentence. Six days after her release, she was arrested yet again and charged with three separate counts of felony breaking and entering and larceny. Her trial was set for June 3 and she left town in the interim. Her brother, Jerome Little, acted as Joan's partner for certain break-ins and another string of criminalized offenses that led to her being imprisoned in 1974.

She returned to Washington in time for the trial, accompanied by Julius Rogers and two minors. The minors ended up in jail, where they were sexually harassed by a guard who offered them freedom if one would "give him some." Little was convicted on June 4, 1974, and asked to remain in the county jail rather than be transferred to the Correctional Facility for Women in Raleigh, as would have been customary. Serving her time in Washington, she said, would allow her to stay close to home, where she could work on raising her bond.

== Trial for murder ==
=== Self-defense against jailor ===
Nearly three months later, before dawn on August 27, 1974, a police officer delivering a drunken prisoner to the Beaufort County jail discovered the body of jailer Clarence Alligood, 62, on Joan Little's bunk, naked from the waist down. Alligood had suffered stab wounds to the temple and the heart area from an icepick. Semen was discovered on his leg. Little was missing. She turned herself in to North Carolina authorities more than one week later, and said that she had killed Alligood while defending herself against sexual assault.

During the subsequent trial, the defense would present testimony from several former inmates who testified that Alligood had a history of using his authority to elicit sexual favors from female prisoners. Witnesses, including Phyllis Ann Moore and Ida Mae Roberson, testified that Alligood frequently provided inmates with small "gifts," such as snacks, cigarettes, and magazines, with the expectation of receiving sexual acts in return.

Having fled from prison, Little was known as a fugitive, and police were therefore authorized to kill her on sight. Little accordingly traveled to Raleigh to turn herself in. She was put on trial for murder and if found guilty would face the North Carolina gas chamber. She had found refuge in the home of an older Black man from her community and had also received offers to seek refuge in other countries.

=== Charged with first degree murder ===
Little was charged with first degree murder, which carried a mandatory death sentence under state law at the time. The capital status of the case, and the fact that North Carolina was home to more than one third of all the death penalty cases in the United States, drew the attention of anti-death penalty and prisoners' rights advocates. Little's trial brought attention to her being the first woman of color to cite self-defense during sexual assault against an accusation of murder. The racial component drew the attention of civil rights activists, and the gender component drew the attention of feminists. The combination of these three factors, along with sophisticated fundraising tactics, allowed the Joan Little Defense Committee to raise over $350,000. Jerry Paul and Karen Bethea-Shields (Karen Galloway) were her attorneys. The question of whether or not Black people were treated equally by the criminal justice systems in the American South drew the attention of the national media.

=== The trial ===
The trial opened on July 14, 1975. The defense team made crucial use of applied social science, including the new method of scientific jury selection, which had just come into existence in 1972. The defense commissioned surveys with a view to comparing popular attitudes among White people toward Black people between Beaufort and Pitt Counties, in the state's northeast, and the north central area of the state. The results showed that unfavorable racial stereotypes were more strongly held in Beaufort County. For example, about two-thirds of the respondents in Beaufort and Pitt Counties thought Black women were lewder than White women and that Black people were more violent than White people. Armed with this information, her Attorney Jerry Paul successfully petitioned to have the trial moved to the state capital of Raleigh.

At trial, the prosecution contended that Little was a lewd woman who had seduced Alligood only to murder him to enable her escape. In two days of testimony, Little testified that Alligood, who at well over 200 pounds was nearly twice her size, had come to her cell three times between 10:00 pm and 3:00 am to solicit sex, finally forcing her at the point of an ice pick to perform oral sex. She testified she was able to seize the ice pick while he was seated on her bunk because he had let his guard down in the moments after his orgasm. She had stabbed him repeatedly, and she testified he had resisted fiercely and wrestled her, but that given his wounded state, she had been able to get free of him. Attorney Jerry Paul made liberal use of the jury's Southern Christian sympathies, characterizing his client as a religious woman who found solace in the Bible in times of trouble.

William Griffin was the prosecutor who had concluded that Little had lured the 62-year-old jailer so she could escape.

When the autopsy came back, it was concluded that Little's explanation of the incident was true. The autopsy concluded that the eleven stab wounds given to Alligood were in self-defense. Only one stab had been a fatal one, while the other ten were clear signs of self-defense against an attacker.

On August 15, 1975, the jury of six Whites and six African Americans deliberated for one hour and 25 minutes and rendered a verdict of not guilty. Among them were Jennie Lancaster, Pecola Jones, and 26-year-old jury spokesperson Mark Neilsen. Little broke down in sobs upon hearing the verdict.

Jerry Paul had Joan Little walk around in front of the media with the book To Kill a Mockingbird in order to encourage comparisons between her and Tom Robinson, the imprisoned Black man of the novel.

The Free Joan campaigns were successful enough that Joan's counsel were able to get the first degree murder charge reduced to second degree murder. Judge Hamilton H. Hobgood noted that the prosecution did not have liable evidence.

Joan Little was returned to prison to serve the remainder of her sentence for breaking and entering. One month before she would have been eligible for parole, she made an escape. She was caught and then convicted and sentenced for the escape. She was freed in June 1979 and moved to New York City.

=== Legacy of trial ===
Joan Little was the first woman in the United States to be acquitted of murder committed in self-defense against a sexual assault.

Joan Little's trial attracted the attention of many political activists, including Angela Davis; Rosa Parks, who formed a local chapter for Little's defense; and Karen Galloway, a former Duke University Law student who worked closely with Joan Little on her case. Galloway spent countless hours with Ms. Little and came to know her better than anyone else during the trial. Others who took part in Little's case included Maulana Karenga (Ron Karenga); Ralph Abernathy, who spoke during a protest outside Beaufort County courthouse; Bernice Johnson Reagon, who contributed to funding support for Ms. Little; and Dr. Larry Little, a Black Panther Party leader (Winston-Salem chapter), who stood by Little's side and was vocal in his concerns about the trial and about subjects that weren't well covered during the trial.

During the Little trial, other women came forward to testify about Alligood's history of sexual assault in prison, including African-American women Ida Mae Roberson and Phyllis Ann Moore. Their testimony encouraged Little's jury to lean toward her defense.

== Aftermath ==
Little's murder trial focused national attention on the issues of a woman's right to defend herself from rape, the validity of capital punishment in North Carolina, racial and sexual inequality in the criminal justice system, and the rights of prisoners in general. It also inspired women's rights movements abroad, including Joan-søstrene (The Joan sisters) in Denmark.

"Free Joan Little" was a slogan that activists used in order to raise awareness of her situation and try to get her released. It was said that without the funding and activists' support, Joan Little would possibly be serving a death sentence.

Jerry Paul, Joan Little's chief attorney, was sentenced to fourteen days in jail in contempt of court for making derogatory comments against Judge Hobgood in the trial.

The trial became a globally known case, with observers split between those who believed her to be guilty and those who did not. Those standing behind her saw a woman who was a victim of racism and sexism, and was vulnerable because she was the only female prisoner at the Beaufort jail during that time. Those who thought of her as being guilty saw her as luring Alligood into her cell with ideas of sex and killing him in order to escape the prison.

The case was well known during the late '70s, because it had shown signs of what the Black movement as well as other movements wanted to stand behind. These organizations came together to support Little because of the connections there were between racism, sexism, rape against women of color, women's rights, and, particularly, the double bind that African-American women have to deal with within the prison industrial complex.

Little authored a poem titled "I Am Somebody," which was incorporated into a mural in San Diego's Chicano Park.

In 1975, Bernice Johnson Reagon wrote a song titled Joanne Little which she sang with her a cappella musical group, that she founded in 1973 called Sweet Honey in the Rock. The song first appeared on a 1975 Mariposa Folk Festival recording, and then the song officially appeared again on Sweet Honey in the Rock’s first album which was a self-titled album that was released in 1976. The song also re-appeared once again on their 2005 live album Raise Your Voice, the song was retitled as Joan Little.

Little is one of the subjects of Jayne Cortez's poem "Rape," along with Inez García.

== Later life ==
In 1981, Little was shot in New York, but later recovered from her injuries. A month before the shooting, she had found the message "Death to Joan" scrawled on a mirror in her Brooklyn apartment. After this incident, she moved to a different apartment.

In 1989, Little was arrested in New Jersey on charges including driving a stolen car. She telephoned William Kunstler, who had assisted her in the past, for help. She had returned to New York a free woman but at 34 years old, accompanied by a male, she was pulled over for driving a car with missing front license plate and stolen back license plate, as well as additional charges. She remained the night at the Hudson County jail.

Since the 1989 arrest, Little has disappeared from public view, though as of April 2026 she is still alive.

== See also ==
- Celia (slave)
- Lena Baker
- Ruby McCollum
- Inez García
- Yvonne Wanrow
