= Yvonne Swan =

Sinixt Native American activist (born 1943)

Yvonne L. Swan
- Born: Yvonne Wanrow; 1943 (age 82–83); Inchelium, Washington, U.S.
- Education: Colville High School
- Occupation: Activist of the Confederated Tribes of the Colville Reservation (Sinixt)
- Known for: State of Washington v. Wanrow (1972–1979)
- Movement: American Indian Movement
- Children: 3

Yvonne L. Swan (née Wanrow; born 1943), also known as Yvonne Swan Wanrow, is an American activist from the Colville Indian Reservation. A Sinixt, she is a Native American and is part of the Confederated Tribes of the Colville Reservation. Under the surname Wanrow, she is known for her 1970s murder trial with the State of Washington, which initiated proceedings against her after she shot and killed a White man who was allegedly trying to rape her toddler nephew on August 11, 1972. While she was initially sentenced to 20 years in prison for second degree murder and first degree assault, an appeal saw her instead being convicted of manslaughter and sentenced to probation, thus leading to her becoming a cause célèbre among feminists and the American Indian Movement. Her case eventually reached the Washington Supreme Court, where its outcome had far-reaching effects on women's self-defense and the law, and the manner in which juries interpret the behavior of a defendant, the legality of recorded conversations, and considerations for victims of sexual assault.

== Early life and education ==
Swan was born Yvonne Wanrow in 1943, in Inchelium, Washington, a city on the Colville Indian Reservation. She was the seventh of eight children. Her father farmed, hunted wild game, and found paid work when he could. Her mother often acted as an interpreter for elderly Native Americans; through this involvement she became an activist against the government's efforts to make Native Americans assimilate into mainstream American society.

In 1962, after graduating from Colville High School, Swan married and had a son and a daughter named Darren and Julie, respectively. The marriage ended in 1966. Following her divorce, she applied to the Bureau of Indian Affairs (BIA) for a grant to study fashion design in San Francisco. She was one of the many Native Americans who were encouraged by the BIA at that time to leave the Indian reservations to seek success in regular American urban centers, as part of the Bureau's assimilation process of "relocation" and "termination." The BIA did not allow her to take her children with her, and she left them in the care of her parents. Child protective services later took her children from her parents and placed them in foster care.

Swan wanted her children to join her in San Francisco. The authorities required her to have a job, an apartment, and a babysitter—all conditions that Swan had satisfied by 1967. Within a month of their arrival, her three-year-old daughter suddenly died of encephalitis. Swan then attempted to reconcile with her ex-husband and moved with him and their son to Portland, Oregon, where they had a daughter named Yvette. However, the couple could not get their relationship to work and she left him permanently, taking their two children with her to Washington. In the summer of 1971, Swan settled in Spokane, intending to complete the arts degree that she had started after graduating from design school. At the time, there was a relatively large Native American population in Spokane, owing to its proximity to several reservations. With regard to this period of her life, Swan stated: "There was a lot of anti-Indian sentiment. ... I was always bailing people out of jail, and I was always helping people out of predicaments and sheltering people. ... Indian people were not popular [with the police in Spokane]. It seems like they were the ones that always got arrested and got put in jail." The only affordable housing for her was located in a high-crime neighborhood, where, concerned for her family's safety, she purchased a gun.

== State of Washington v. Wanrow ==
State of Washington v. Wanrow was a murder case that drew national and international attention. In August 1972, while at the home of a friend in Spokane, Swan shot two unwanted visitors, killing one man and injuring the other, in what she claimed was self-defense. After speaking to the police by phone, she was arrested and charged with second degree murder and first degree assault. A jury found her guilty and she was sentenced to 20 years. On appeal, the conviction was reversed on a number of errors by the trial judge. The prosecutors appealed to the Washington Supreme Court, where the reversal was upheld. The landmark Supreme Court opinion had far-reaching effects on women's self-defense and the law. Days before the retrial was set to begin, on April 26, 1979, an agreement was reached with the State. Swan pleaded guilty to the lesser charges of manslaughter and second-degree assault, for which she received five years of probation and one year of community service. Her incarceration over the seven years of court proceedings amounted to the three days she spent in jail after her initial arrest.

=== Events on August 11, 1972 ===
While details of the events of August 11, 1972 were contested in court, there was no disagreement over what generally occurred. That day, Swan left her two children at the home of her friend, Shirley Hooper, while she attended a doctor's appointment. Swan's foot was in a cast, and this was the first day she was allowed to put weight on it.

Hooper was concerned for the safety of her home. Her house was located in a largely industrial area, with few other residences and poorly lit at night. Seven months earlier, her young daughter had been sexually assaulted, evidenced by a sexually transmitted infection she contracted, but the daughter had refused to identify her assailant. A few nights earlier, Hooper had spotted a man crouching near the house. And on two nights before, her bedroom window screen had been slashed.

That day, Swan's son ran home and complained to Hooper that her next door neighbor, William Wesler, had grabbed him, but he had managed to break free. Shortly after, Wesler arrived at the house, saying he hadn't touched the boy. At that point, Hooper's daughter identified him as the man who had molested her months earlier. Hooper's landlords, a married couple, at the house fixing the slashed screen, witnessed the events. After Wesler left, Hooper called the police, who arrived, took a statement, and told Hooper they could not arrest Wesler "until Monday morning" after she filed a formal complaint. The police also agreed with a suggestion that she should hit Wesler with a baseball bat, but to "wait until he gets in the house". They also suggested she sprinkle flour under her bedroom window, to record footprints if someone climbed in.

Some time after 6 pm, Hooper called Swan in a panic, told her about the altercation and the daughter's identification of Wesler as the attacker, and asked her to bring her gun. Swan advised Hooper to bring all the children to her home where they would be safe, but Hooper insisted on staying in her house. Swan arrived at Hooper's place, where the landlord informed the two mothers that Wesler had attempted to molest the young boy of a previous tenant at the same residence, and that it was rumored that he had been committed to a mental institute.

Late at night after the landlord left, Swan and Hooper became frightened. They invited Swan's sister and brother-in-law to the house, and they arrived with three of their children. The four adults stayed awake to guard against possible aggression. At about five o'clock in the morning, unbeknownst to the women in the house, Swan's brother-in-law went to Wesler's residence and accused him of pedophilia. Wesler suggested they reconcile their differences, and with an associate, the men returned to the Hooper home. As Wesler, visibly intoxicated, entered the residence, Hooper yelled at him to get out, causing a commotion. Swan's three-year-old nephew awoke and began crying, prompting Wesler, who had by this time entered the home, to state, "My, what a cute little boy". Wesler made a move towards the child, which upset his mother, Swan's sister. An emotional situation developed. At one point, Swan turned around to find Wesler looming over her. She drew her pistol and shot and killed Wesler. She also fired at his associate, who was hit in the arm and fled the house.

Hooper called Crime Check, an emergency phone number similar to 911, and the call was recorded. During the conversation, the telephone was passed to Swan, who confessed to the killing and expressed a distrust of the police. Although she was upset, Swan was not screaming. The stereotype of a "hysterical woman" was used against her by the prosecution to persuade the jury that she was calm. This recording was to play prominently in her conviction and in its subsequent overturn.

=== Proceedings ===
Unable to convince her public defenders to fight for her, Swan initially pleaded guilty. Later, following the counsel of a new attorney, she changed her plea to not guilty by reason of temporary insanity and self-defense. The prosecution alleged that Swan was not in any danger and that she took the law into her own hands. This argument relied on ethnic stereotypes the jury would have been familiar with from the media, and the verdict may have been influenced by militant actions by the American Indian Movement (AIM), which was covered in a negative light in Spokane. In 1973, Swan was convicted of second-degree murder and first-degree assault. Defense attorney Eugene I. Annis appealed the ruling on eleven counts of judicial error.

In 1975, the appeals court reversed the conviction and ordered a retrial. They found that:

- the jury was not sequestered and an article of Swan's earlier guilty plea appeared in the evening paper. When Wanrow's defense moved for a retrial, it was denied after the jury was questioned as a group whether they saw the newspaper and they said no,
- the recorded confession was used as evidence in violation of the law,
- the judge's use of masculine pronouns while reading the law and instructing jurors predisposed them to an interpretation of the law that did not account for the necessity of weaponry in inter-gender conflicts, especially considering the fact that Swan was handicapped by a broken leg, a cast, and crutches at the time,
- the presiding judge had not allowed expert testimony that would have provided necessary cultural background on the Colville Indian culture, and,
- the judge did not read jurors a recently enacted law that dictated that they not interpret self-defense murder cases on the basis of whether the defender was actually in danger of his or her life, but only whether they believed themselves to be in danger.

In 1976, the prosecutors in the case, Donald Brockett and Fred Caruso, petitioned the Washington Supreme Court against the ruling, but it was upheld in 1977. During the Supreme Court appeal, Swan was represented by attorneys Elizabeth M. Schneider and Nancy Stearns, of New York's Center for Constitutional Rights (CCR). The case was remanded to Spokane Superior Court for retrial.

Prior to the scheduled 1979 trial, the prosecution offered a plea bargain: if Swan pleaded to manslaughter and second-degree assault, they would drop the weapons charge (which carried a mandatory five-year prison sentence) and they would not recommend prison. After lengthy discussions with her attorneys, which also included William Kunstler, Swan learned that self-defense was included in manslaughter, and she agreed to plea to the reduced charges.

On April 26, 1979 following an all-day mitigation hearing, Judge Harold D. Clark suspended prison terms of not more than 20 and 10 years on the two charges, and placed her on probation for five years. In lieu of one-year jail time, he ordered 2,000 hours of community service, which she served by counseling alcoholics and teaching culture to Indian students on her home reservation. During the sentencing, Clark commented that Swan had clearly "turned her life around" and that prison or jail time would serve no purpose and "could only be termed retribution." In a statement to the judge, Swan said: "I see many problems in the Native American world, the red nation. I am studying the causes of the problems (as a second-year student at Evergreen State College). ... given the chance, I could fulfill my duty as a human being on the earth, to help construct a better future and not to destroy." In court, she stated that she intended to dedicate her life to public service work.

=== Results ===
The January 7, 1977 Washington Supreme Court ruling in State of Washington v. Wanrow was an important victory for the feminist cause of gender-equality before the law. In a landmark ruling, the Supreme Court, sitting en banc, declared that Yvonne Wanrow was entitled to have a jury consider her actions in the light of her "perceptions of the situation, including those perceptions which were the product of our nation's long and unfortunate history of sex discrimination." The ruling was the first in America recognizing the particular legal problems of women who defend themselves or their children from male attackers, and was again affirmed by the Washington Supreme Court in denying the prosecutor's petition for rehearing in 1979. Before the Wanrow decision, standard jury instructions asked what a "reasonably prudent man" would have done, even if the accused was a woman; the Wanrow decision set a precedent that when a woman is tried in a criminal trial the juries should ask "what a reasonably prudent woman similarly situated would have done." (Note: "[The instructions as given by the trial court] leaves the jury with the impression the objective standard to be applied is that applicable to an altercation between two men. The impression created — that a 5-foot 4-inch woman with a cast on her leg and using a crutch must, under the law, somehow repel an assault by a 6-foot 2-inch intoxicated man without employing weapons in her defense, unless the jury finds her determination of the degree of danger to be objectively reasonable — constitutes a separate and distinct misstatement of the law and, in the context of this case, violates the respondent's right to equal protection of the law. The respondent was entitled to have the jury consider her actions in the light of her own perceptions of the situation, including those perceptions which were the product of our nation's "long and unfortunate history of sex discrimination." ... Until such time as the effects of that history are eradicated, care must be taken to assure that our self-defense instructions afford women the right to have their conduct judged in light of the individual physical handicaps which are the product of sex discrimination. To fail to do so is to deny the right of the individual woman involved to trial by the same rules which are applicable to male defendants." - State v. Wanrow, 88 Wn. 2d 221, 88 Wash. 2d 221, 559 P.2d 548 (Wash. 1977))

Over the course of her State v. Wanrow years, Swan became an active speaker for the women's movement, which raised funds on her behalf. The American Indian Movement helped Swan, too, and took advantage of the opportunity to highlight unequal treatment of Native Americans by the criminal justice system. Ellen Earth, a spokesperson for the Yvonne Wanrow Defense Committee, stated that the committee wanted to "make the trial last as long as possible" in order to '[reeducate] the jury about Indians". Swan stated, "The trial would not have taken place had I been an affluent white woman who killed an American Indian. Instead, after one week, I was convicted by an all-white jury on May 13, 1973 (Mother's Day) for killing a known child molester. I had heard about Wesler's background as a sex offender the night before the shooting, but was not allowed to bring up the information at trial. The police tape played a role in bringing about the conviction — the jury was allowed to hear it two times."

== Activism ==
According to Wanrow, State v. Wanrow was an epiphany in her life. As a result of her non-survival in mainstream American society, she experienced cognitive dissonance and poverty. Her killing of Wesler served to awaken her to her traditionally ascribed gender role, that of a mother devoted entirely to her children. She also found solace in her culture's spirituality and philosophy, which advocated a lifestyle that was family-oriented and harmonious with nature. As a result, she returned to her reservation, where she worked for the improvement of the community and opposed mining to protect the environment. She also became involved in later cases involving murder charges against Indian women, and, in 1993 was the International Indian Treaty Councils (IITC) political prisoners coordinator, when she advocated the case of Norma Jean Croy.

Swan participated in the 1989 highway construction blockade at Vallican, British Columbia. The provincial highway project was intended to pass through a 4,000-year-old Native burial ground. The demonstration was tense, with threats of violence, and local residents lining up on both sides of the issue. In the end, while highway construction was not halted in court, the site was given an "archeological" designation, the road diverted around it, and the unearthed remains returned for reburial.

In October, 2020, at age 76, Swan took part in a demonstration in support of Sinixt aboriginal land rights in British Columbia, Canada. The group, comprising mostly Confederated Tribe of the Colville Reservation members, including Swan and other Sinixt descendants, gathered at the Washington border, overlooking the crossing into BC. The gathering marked the final appeal of a 10-year-old aboriginal rights case, being heard at the Supreme Court of Canada. The defendant, Sinixt descendent Rick Desautel, had shot an elk on a ceremonial hunt on what he claimed was Sinixt land in BC. The Canadian government held that no such right existed. The government had declared the Sinixt tribe legally extinct after the last known member in Canada died in 1956. Swan said her participation remembered her Sinixt heritage, and was part of the larger struggle to restore native homelands. In April 2021, the Supreme Court ruled that the Sinixt tribe has constitutionally protected Indigenous rights to hunt in their ancestral territory.

== See also ==
- Battered woman syndrome
- Inez Garcia
- Joan Little
